

115001–115100 

|-bgcolor=#d6d6d6
| 115001 ||  || — || August 24, 2003 || Socorro || LINEAR || — || align=right | 6.2 km || 
|-id=002 bgcolor=#fefefe
| 115002 ||  || — || August 24, 2003 || Socorro || LINEAR || FLO || align=right | 1.3 km || 
|-id=003 bgcolor=#d6d6d6
| 115003 ||  || — || August 24, 2003 || Socorro || LINEAR || EOS || align=right | 3.8 km || 
|-id=004 bgcolor=#d6d6d6
| 115004 ||  || — || August 24, 2003 || Socorro || LINEAR || — || align=right | 4.0 km || 
|-id=005 bgcolor=#fefefe
| 115005 ||  || — || August 24, 2003 || Socorro || LINEAR || FLO || align=right | 1.3 km || 
|-id=006 bgcolor=#fefefe
| 115006 ||  || — || August 24, 2003 || Socorro || LINEAR || FLO || align=right | 1.3 km || 
|-id=007 bgcolor=#d6d6d6
| 115007 ||  || — || August 24, 2003 || Socorro || LINEAR || — || align=right | 3.7 km || 
|-id=008 bgcolor=#E9E9E9
| 115008 ||  || — || August 24, 2003 || Socorro || LINEAR || — || align=right | 6.5 km || 
|-id=009 bgcolor=#d6d6d6
| 115009 ||  || — || August 24, 2003 || Socorro || LINEAR || — || align=right | 8.4 km || 
|-id=010 bgcolor=#fefefe
| 115010 ||  || — || August 24, 2003 || Socorro || LINEAR || — || align=right | 1.8 km || 
|-id=011 bgcolor=#fefefe
| 115011 ||  || — || August 24, 2003 || Socorro || LINEAR || PHO || align=right | 1.7 km || 
|-id=012 bgcolor=#E9E9E9
| 115012 ||  || — || August 24, 2003 || Socorro || LINEAR || — || align=right | 5.2 km || 
|-id=013 bgcolor=#E9E9E9
| 115013 ||  || — || August 24, 2003 || Socorro || LINEAR || EUN || align=right | 3.7 km || 
|-id=014 bgcolor=#fefefe
| 115014 ||  || — || August 25, 2003 || Socorro || LINEAR || LCI || align=right | 1.9 km || 
|-id=015 bgcolor=#d6d6d6
| 115015 Chang Díaz ||  ||  || August 24, 2003 || Cerro Tololo || M. W. Buie || — || align=right | 6.1 km || 
|-id=016 bgcolor=#fefefe
| 115016 ||  || — || August 25, 2003 || Socorro || LINEAR || NYS || align=right | 3.2 km || 
|-id=017 bgcolor=#d6d6d6
| 115017 ||  || — || August 25, 2003 || Socorro || LINEAR || — || align=right | 5.9 km || 
|-id=018 bgcolor=#fefefe
| 115018 ||  || — || August 26, 2003 || Socorro || LINEAR || V || align=right | 1.2 km || 
|-id=019 bgcolor=#E9E9E9
| 115019 ||  || — || August 28, 2003 || Socorro || LINEAR || — || align=right | 6.4 km || 
|-id=020 bgcolor=#fefefe
| 115020 ||  || — || August 28, 2003 || Socorro || LINEAR || V || align=right | 1.5 km || 
|-id=021 bgcolor=#d6d6d6
| 115021 ||  || — || August 28, 2003 || Haleakala || NEAT || — || align=right | 6.9 km || 
|-id=022 bgcolor=#fefefe
| 115022 ||  || — || August 28, 2003 || Haleakala || NEAT || NYS || align=right | 1.00 km || 
|-id=023 bgcolor=#d6d6d6
| 115023 ||  || — || August 29, 2003 || Haleakala || NEAT || EUP || align=right | 7.2 km || 
|-id=024 bgcolor=#fefefe
| 115024 ||  || — || August 30, 2003 || Kitt Peak || Spacewatch || V || align=right data-sort-value="0.99" | 990 m || 
|-id=025 bgcolor=#d6d6d6
| 115025 ||  || — || August 28, 2003 || Palomar || NEAT || URS || align=right | 7.3 km || 
|-id=026 bgcolor=#fefefe
| 115026 ||  || — || August 28, 2003 || Haleakala || NEAT || — || align=right data-sort-value="0.96" | 960 m || 
|-id=027 bgcolor=#d6d6d6
| 115027 ||  || — || August 29, 2003 || Haleakala || NEAT || — || align=right | 6.5 km || 
|-id=028 bgcolor=#E9E9E9
| 115028 ||  || — || August 31, 2003 || Kitt Peak || Spacewatch || — || align=right | 2.6 km || 
|-id=029 bgcolor=#E9E9E9
| 115029 ||  || — || August 31, 2003 || Socorro || LINEAR || — || align=right | 4.3 km || 
|-id=030 bgcolor=#fefefe
| 115030 ||  || — || August 31, 2003 || Haleakala || NEAT || — || align=right | 1.8 km || 
|-id=031 bgcolor=#fefefe
| 115031 ||  || — || August 28, 2003 || Socorro || LINEAR || H || align=right | 1.3 km || 
|-id=032 bgcolor=#d6d6d6
| 115032 ||  || — || August 29, 2003 || Haleakala || NEAT || THB || align=right | 7.7 km || 
|-id=033 bgcolor=#fefefe
| 115033 ||  || — || August 31, 2003 || Haleakala || NEAT || FLO || align=right | 1.1 km || 
|-id=034 bgcolor=#E9E9E9
| 115034 ||  || — || August 31, 2003 || Haleakala || NEAT || — || align=right | 3.4 km || 
|-id=035 bgcolor=#fefefe
| 115035 ||  || — || August 30, 2003 || Haleakala || NEAT || FLO || align=right | 1.2 km || 
|-id=036 bgcolor=#E9E9E9
| 115036 ||  || — || August 30, 2003 || Kitt Peak || Spacewatch || ADE || align=right | 4.1 km || 
|-id=037 bgcolor=#fefefe
| 115037 ||  || — || August 31, 2003 || Socorro || LINEAR || H || align=right | 1.4 km || 
|-id=038 bgcolor=#fefefe
| 115038 ||  || — || August 31, 2003 || Socorro || LINEAR || NYS || align=right | 1.3 km || 
|-id=039 bgcolor=#fefefe
| 115039 ||  || — || August 31, 2003 || Socorro || LINEAR || V || align=right | 1.6 km || 
|-id=040 bgcolor=#fefefe
| 115040 ||  || — || August 31, 2003 || Socorro || LINEAR || — || align=right | 1.2 km || 
|-id=041 bgcolor=#d6d6d6
| 115041 ||  || — || August 31, 2003 || Socorro || LINEAR || — || align=right | 6.1 km || 
|-id=042 bgcolor=#E9E9E9
| 115042 ||  || — || August 20, 2003 || Socorro || LINEAR || HNS || align=right | 3.9 km || 
|-id=043 bgcolor=#d6d6d6
| 115043 || 2003 RH || — || September 1, 2003 || Socorro || LINEAR || EOS || align=right | 4.7 km || 
|-id=044 bgcolor=#fefefe
| 115044 || 2003 RQ || — || September 2, 2003 || Socorro || LINEAR || V || align=right | 2.0 km || 
|-id=045 bgcolor=#E9E9E9
| 115045 ||  || — || September 1, 2003 || Socorro || LINEAR || EUN || align=right | 3.8 km || 
|-id=046 bgcolor=#fefefe
| 115046 ||  || — || September 1, 2003 || Socorro || LINEAR || V || align=right | 1.3 km || 
|-id=047 bgcolor=#d6d6d6
| 115047 ||  || — || September 2, 2003 || Socorro || LINEAR || — || align=right | 6.2 km || 
|-id=048 bgcolor=#fefefe
| 115048 ||  || — || September 3, 2003 || Haleakala || NEAT || — || align=right | 1.9 km || 
|-id=049 bgcolor=#E9E9E9
| 115049 ||  || — || September 3, 2003 || Haleakala || NEAT || — || align=right | 2.7 km || 
|-id=050 bgcolor=#fefefe
| 115050 ||  || — || September 3, 2003 || Haleakala || NEAT || V || align=right | 1.4 km || 
|-id=051 bgcolor=#d6d6d6
| 115051 Safaeinili ||  ||  || September 4, 2003 || Campo Imperatore || CINEOS || — || align=right | 6.2 km || 
|-id=052 bgcolor=#FFC2E0
| 115052 ||  || — || September 5, 2003 || Socorro || LINEAR || AMO +1km || align=right | 1.2 km || 
|-id=053 bgcolor=#d6d6d6
| 115053 ||  || — || September 1, 2003 || Socorro || LINEAR || — || align=right | 4.5 km || 
|-id=054 bgcolor=#d6d6d6
| 115054 ||  || — || September 1, 2003 || Socorro || LINEAR || — || align=right | 5.6 km || 
|-id=055 bgcolor=#E9E9E9
| 115055 ||  || — || September 3, 2003 || Črni Vrh || Črni Vrh || — || align=right | 4.3 km || 
|-id=056 bgcolor=#E9E9E9
| 115056 ||  || — || September 4, 2003 || Socorro || LINEAR || — || align=right | 3.0 km || 
|-id=057 bgcolor=#E9E9E9
| 115057 ||  || — || September 4, 2003 || Socorro || LINEAR || — || align=right | 4.7 km || 
|-id=058 bgcolor=#fefefe
| 115058 Tassantal ||  ||  || September 4, 2003 || Piszkéstető || K. Sárneczky, B. Sipőcz || V || align=right data-sort-value="0.98" | 980 m || 
|-id=059 bgcolor=#d6d6d6
| 115059 Nagykároly ||  ||  || September 5, 2003 || Piszkéstető || K. Sárneczky, B. Sipőcz || — || align=right | 4.8 km || 
|-id=060 bgcolor=#fefefe
| 115060 ||  || — || September 13, 2003 || Haleakala || NEAT || — || align=right | 1.8 km || 
|-id=061 bgcolor=#fefefe
| 115061 ||  || — || September 14, 2003 || Haleakala || NEAT || V || align=right | 1.3 km || 
|-id=062 bgcolor=#fefefe
| 115062 ||  || — || September 13, 2003 || Haleakala || NEAT || NYS || align=right | 1.6 km || 
|-id=063 bgcolor=#fefefe
| 115063 ||  || — || September 14, 2003 || Haleakala || NEAT || — || align=right | 1.6 km || 
|-id=064 bgcolor=#d6d6d6
| 115064 ||  || — || September 14, 2003 || Haleakala || NEAT || — || align=right | 3.7 km || 
|-id=065 bgcolor=#fefefe
| 115065 ||  || — || September 15, 2003 || Anderson Mesa || LONEOS || V || align=right | 1.4 km || 
|-id=066 bgcolor=#E9E9E9
| 115066 ||  || — || September 15, 2003 || Anderson Mesa || LONEOS || GEF || align=right | 3.5 km || 
|-id=067 bgcolor=#fefefe
| 115067 ||  || — || September 15, 2003 || Anderson Mesa || LONEOS || — || align=right | 1.9 km || 
|-id=068 bgcolor=#d6d6d6
| 115068 ||  || — || September 15, 2003 || Anderson Mesa || LONEOS || KOR || align=right | 2.6 km || 
|-id=069 bgcolor=#d6d6d6
| 115069 ||  || — || September 15, 2003 || Anderson Mesa || LONEOS || 3:2 || align=right | 8.5 km || 
|-id=070 bgcolor=#d6d6d6
| 115070 ||  || — || September 13, 2003 || Haleakala || NEAT || — || align=right | 5.6 km || 
|-id=071 bgcolor=#fefefe
| 115071 ||  || — || September 15, 2003 || Haleakala || NEAT || — || align=right | 1.6 km || 
|-id=072 bgcolor=#d6d6d6
| 115072 ||  || — || September 15, 2003 || Haleakala || NEAT || — || align=right | 7.3 km || 
|-id=073 bgcolor=#E9E9E9
| 115073 ||  || — || September 14, 2003 || Palomar || NEAT || — || align=right | 2.3 km || 
|-id=074 bgcolor=#fefefe
| 115074 ||  || — || September 14, 2003 || Palomar || NEAT || PHO || align=right | 3.0 km || 
|-id=075 bgcolor=#fefefe
| 115075 ||  || — || September 14, 2003 || Haleakala || NEAT || — || align=right | 1.9 km || 
|-id=076 bgcolor=#fefefe
| 115076 ||  || — || September 15, 2003 || Anderson Mesa || LONEOS || — || align=right | 1.4 km || 
|-id=077 bgcolor=#d6d6d6
| 115077 ||  || — || September 15, 2003 || Palomar || NEAT || URS || align=right | 7.6 km || 
|-id=078 bgcolor=#E9E9E9
| 115078 ||  || — || September 3, 2003 || Haleakala || NEAT || — || align=right | 3.1 km || 
|-id=079 bgcolor=#fefefe
| 115079 ||  || — || September 16, 2003 || Palomar || NEAT || FLO || align=right | 1.0 km || 
|-id=080 bgcolor=#E9E9E9
| 115080 ||  || — || September 16, 2003 || Palomar || NEAT || — || align=right | 3.3 km || 
|-id=081 bgcolor=#fefefe
| 115081 ||  || — || September 16, 2003 || Kitt Peak || Spacewatch || MAS || align=right | 1.0 km || 
|-id=082 bgcolor=#fefefe
| 115082 ||  || — || September 17, 2003 || Desert Eagle || W. K. Y. Yeung || — || align=right | 1.5 km || 
|-id=083 bgcolor=#fefefe
| 115083 ||  || — || September 16, 2003 || Palomar || NEAT || V || align=right | 1.4 km || 
|-id=084 bgcolor=#E9E9E9
| 115084 ||  || — || September 17, 2003 || Kitt Peak || Spacewatch || — || align=right | 3.0 km || 
|-id=085 bgcolor=#E9E9E9
| 115085 ||  || — || September 16, 2003 || Kitt Peak || Spacewatch || AGN || align=right | 2.4 km || 
|-id=086 bgcolor=#E9E9E9
| 115086 ||  || — || September 16, 2003 || Kitt Peak || Spacewatch || — || align=right | 3.9 km || 
|-id=087 bgcolor=#d6d6d6
| 115087 ||  || — || September 16, 2003 || Kitt Peak || Spacewatch || — || align=right | 4.6 km || 
|-id=088 bgcolor=#d6d6d6
| 115088 ||  || — || September 16, 2003 || Kitt Peak || Spacewatch || SHU3:2 || align=right | 9.3 km || 
|-id=089 bgcolor=#d6d6d6
| 115089 ||  || — || September 17, 2003 || Kitt Peak || Spacewatch || — || align=right | 5.5 km || 
|-id=090 bgcolor=#fefefe
| 115090 ||  || — || September 17, 2003 || Kitt Peak || Spacewatch || MAS || align=right | 1.3 km || 
|-id=091 bgcolor=#E9E9E9
| 115091 ||  || — || September 17, 2003 || Kitt Peak || Spacewatch || EUN || align=right | 3.1 km || 
|-id=092 bgcolor=#d6d6d6
| 115092 ||  || — || September 16, 2003 || Kitt Peak || Spacewatch || — || align=right | 5.7 km || 
|-id=093 bgcolor=#fefefe
| 115093 ||  || — || September 17, 2003 || Goodricke-Pigott || R. A. Tucker || — || align=right | 1.2 km || 
|-id=094 bgcolor=#fefefe
| 115094 ||  || — || September 17, 2003 || Kitt Peak || Spacewatch || V || align=right | 1.5 km || 
|-id=095 bgcolor=#E9E9E9
| 115095 ||  || — || September 17, 2003 || Kitt Peak || Spacewatch || PAD || align=right | 4.0 km || 
|-id=096 bgcolor=#fefefe
| 115096 ||  || — || September 17, 2003 || Kitt Peak || Spacewatch || — || align=right | 1.6 km || 
|-id=097 bgcolor=#d6d6d6
| 115097 ||  || — || September 16, 2003 || Socorro || LINEAR || HIL3:2 || align=right | 15 km || 
|-id=098 bgcolor=#E9E9E9
| 115098 ||  || — || September 16, 2003 || Kitt Peak || Spacewatch || ADE || align=right | 3.8 km || 
|-id=099 bgcolor=#fefefe
| 115099 ||  || — || September 16, 2003 || Kitt Peak || Spacewatch || — || align=right data-sort-value="0.89" | 890 m || 
|-id=100 bgcolor=#d6d6d6
| 115100 ||  || — || September 16, 2003 || Palomar || NEAT || CHA || align=right | 3.6 km || 
|}

115101–115200 

|-bgcolor=#fefefe
| 115101 ||  || — || September 16, 2003 || Palomar || NEAT || — || align=right | 1.7 km || 
|-id=102 bgcolor=#E9E9E9
| 115102 ||  || — || September 17, 2003 || Socorro || LINEAR || — || align=right | 5.3 km || 
|-id=103 bgcolor=#E9E9E9
| 115103 ||  || — || September 17, 2003 || Kitt Peak || Spacewatch || — || align=right | 5.0 km || 
|-id=104 bgcolor=#fefefe
| 115104 ||  || — || September 17, 2003 || Haleakala || NEAT || — || align=right | 1.4 km || 
|-id=105 bgcolor=#fefefe
| 115105 ||  || — || September 17, 2003 || Haleakala || NEAT || FLO || align=right | 1.2 km || 
|-id=106 bgcolor=#fefefe
| 115106 ||  || — || September 18, 2003 || Socorro || LINEAR || V || align=right | 1.1 km || 
|-id=107 bgcolor=#d6d6d6
| 115107 ||  || — || September 18, 2003 || Kitt Peak || Spacewatch || KOR || align=right | 2.9 km || 
|-id=108 bgcolor=#E9E9E9
| 115108 ||  || — || September 18, 2003 || Palomar || NEAT || GEF || align=right | 2.9 km || 
|-id=109 bgcolor=#fefefe
| 115109 ||  || — || September 17, 2003 || Palomar || NEAT || — || align=right | 1.9 km || 
|-id=110 bgcolor=#fefefe
| 115110 ||  || — || September 18, 2003 || Socorro || LINEAR || — || align=right | 1.1 km || 
|-id=111 bgcolor=#fefefe
| 115111 ||  || — || September 16, 2003 || Kitt Peak || Spacewatch || — || align=right | 1.4 km || 
|-id=112 bgcolor=#E9E9E9
| 115112 ||  || — || September 16, 2003 || Palomar || NEAT || — || align=right | 2.7 km || 
|-id=113 bgcolor=#E9E9E9
| 115113 ||  || — || September 16, 2003 || Palomar || NEAT || — || align=right | 3.1 km || 
|-id=114 bgcolor=#d6d6d6
| 115114 ||  || — || September 16, 2003 || Palomar || NEAT || — || align=right | 7.3 km || 
|-id=115 bgcolor=#E9E9E9
| 115115 ||  || — || September 16, 2003 || Palomar || NEAT || — || align=right | 3.2 km || 
|-id=116 bgcolor=#d6d6d6
| 115116 ||  || — || September 16, 2003 || Palomar || NEAT || — || align=right | 6.8 km || 
|-id=117 bgcolor=#d6d6d6
| 115117 ||  || — || September 18, 2003 || Palomar || NEAT || URS || align=right | 8.1 km || 
|-id=118 bgcolor=#fefefe
| 115118 ||  || — || September 16, 2003 || Anderson Mesa || LONEOS || — || align=right | 2.0 km || 
|-id=119 bgcolor=#E9E9E9
| 115119 ||  || — || September 16, 2003 || Anderson Mesa || LONEOS || — || align=right | 1.8 km || 
|-id=120 bgcolor=#E9E9E9
| 115120 ||  || — || September 16, 2003 || Anderson Mesa || LONEOS || WIT || align=right | 2.1 km || 
|-id=121 bgcolor=#d6d6d6
| 115121 ||  || — || September 16, 2003 || Anderson Mesa || LONEOS || — || align=right | 4.6 km || 
|-id=122 bgcolor=#E9E9E9
| 115122 ||  || — || September 16, 2003 || Anderson Mesa || LONEOS || HNS || align=right | 2.8 km || 
|-id=123 bgcolor=#E9E9E9
| 115123 ||  || — || September 18, 2003 || Palomar || NEAT || — || align=right | 6.2 km || 
|-id=124 bgcolor=#fefefe
| 115124 ||  || — || September 18, 2003 || Palomar || NEAT || — || align=right | 2.3 km || 
|-id=125 bgcolor=#fefefe
| 115125 ||  || — || September 18, 2003 || Palomar || NEAT || V || align=right | 1.3 km || 
|-id=126 bgcolor=#E9E9E9
| 115126 ||  || — || September 18, 2003 || Palomar || NEAT || EUN || align=right | 1.8 km || 
|-id=127 bgcolor=#d6d6d6
| 115127 ||  || — || September 18, 2003 || Palomar || NEAT || — || align=right | 4.0 km || 
|-id=128 bgcolor=#d6d6d6
| 115128 ||  || — || September 18, 2003 || Palomar || NEAT || URS || align=right | 8.2 km || 
|-id=129 bgcolor=#fefefe
| 115129 ||  || — || September 18, 2003 || Palomar || NEAT || — || align=right | 3.2 km || 
|-id=130 bgcolor=#E9E9E9
| 115130 ||  || — || September 19, 2003 || Palomar || NEAT || MRX || align=right | 1.9 km || 
|-id=131 bgcolor=#fefefe
| 115131 ||  || — || September 19, 2003 || Palomar || NEAT || — || align=right | 2.2 km || 
|-id=132 bgcolor=#E9E9E9
| 115132 ||  || — || September 16, 2003 || Kitt Peak || Spacewatch || — || align=right | 4.1 km || 
|-id=133 bgcolor=#fefefe
| 115133 ||  || — || September 16, 2003 || Socorro || LINEAR || — || align=right | 2.1 km || 
|-id=134 bgcolor=#fefefe
| 115134 ||  || — || September 16, 2003 || Anderson Mesa || LONEOS || V || align=right | 1.4 km || 
|-id=135 bgcolor=#d6d6d6
| 115135 ||  || — || September 16, 2003 || Kitt Peak || Spacewatch || BRA || align=right | 2.7 km || 
|-id=136 bgcolor=#E9E9E9
| 115136 ||  || — || September 16, 2003 || Kitt Peak || Spacewatch || MAR || align=right | 2.0 km || 
|-id=137 bgcolor=#fefefe
| 115137 ||  || — || September 16, 2003 || Kitt Peak || Spacewatch || — || align=right | 2.1 km || 
|-id=138 bgcolor=#d6d6d6
| 115138 ||  || — || September 17, 2003 || Anderson Mesa || LONEOS || — || align=right | 4.7 km || 
|-id=139 bgcolor=#E9E9E9
| 115139 ||  || — || September 17, 2003 || Anderson Mesa || LONEOS || AER || align=right | 3.3 km || 
|-id=140 bgcolor=#d6d6d6
| 115140 ||  || — || September 17, 2003 || Anderson Mesa || LONEOS || — || align=right | 7.4 km || 
|-id=141 bgcolor=#d6d6d6
| 115141 ||  || — || September 17, 2003 || Socorro || LINEAR || HYG || align=right | 6.6 km || 
|-id=142 bgcolor=#fefefe
| 115142 ||  || — || September 18, 2003 || Campo Imperatore || CINEOS || — || align=right | 1.7 km || 
|-id=143 bgcolor=#fefefe
| 115143 ||  || — || September 18, 2003 || Campo Imperatore || CINEOS || — || align=right | 1.6 km || 
|-id=144 bgcolor=#fefefe
| 115144 ||  || — || September 18, 2003 || Campo Imperatore || CINEOS || MAS || align=right | 1.6 km || 
|-id=145 bgcolor=#E9E9E9
| 115145 ||  || — || September 18, 2003 || Campo Imperatore || CINEOS || WIT || align=right | 2.1 km || 
|-id=146 bgcolor=#E9E9E9
| 115146 ||  || — || September 18, 2003 || Campo Imperatore || CINEOS || — || align=right | 4.2 km || 
|-id=147 bgcolor=#d6d6d6
| 115147 ||  || — || September 19, 2003 || Campo Imperatore || CINEOS || EOS || align=right | 3.3 km || 
|-id=148 bgcolor=#fefefe
| 115148 ||  || — || September 19, 2003 || Campo Imperatore || CINEOS || — || align=right | 1.6 km || 
|-id=149 bgcolor=#d6d6d6
| 115149 ||  || — || September 19, 2003 || Socorro || LINEAR || — || align=right | 4.0 km || 
|-id=150 bgcolor=#fefefe
| 115150 ||  || — || September 19, 2003 || Socorro || LINEAR || FLO || align=right data-sort-value="0.99" | 990 m || 
|-id=151 bgcolor=#d6d6d6
| 115151 ||  || — || September 19, 2003 || Socorro || LINEAR || — || align=right | 3.1 km || 
|-id=152 bgcolor=#E9E9E9
| 115152 ||  || — || September 17, 2003 || Desert Eagle || W. K. Y. Yeung || XIZ || align=right | 2.9 km || 
|-id=153 bgcolor=#fefefe
| 115153 ||  || — || September 17, 2003 || Kitt Peak || Spacewatch || — || align=right | 1.5 km || 
|-id=154 bgcolor=#d6d6d6
| 115154 ||  || — || September 17, 2003 || Kitt Peak || Spacewatch || — || align=right | 4.8 km || 
|-id=155 bgcolor=#fefefe
| 115155 ||  || — || September 18, 2003 || Kitt Peak || Spacewatch || V || align=right | 1.3 km || 
|-id=156 bgcolor=#fefefe
| 115156 ||  || — || September 18, 2003 || Kitt Peak || Spacewatch || V || align=right | 1.3 km || 
|-id=157 bgcolor=#d6d6d6
| 115157 ||  || — || September 18, 2003 || Kitt Peak || Spacewatch || KOR || align=right | 3.2 km || 
|-id=158 bgcolor=#fefefe
| 115158 ||  || — || September 18, 2003 || Kitt Peak || Spacewatch || — || align=right | 1.5 km || 
|-id=159 bgcolor=#E9E9E9
| 115159 ||  || — || September 18, 2003 || Kitt Peak || Spacewatch || — || align=right | 4.6 km || 
|-id=160 bgcolor=#fefefe
| 115160 ||  || — || September 18, 2003 || Kitt Peak || Spacewatch || — || align=right | 1.1 km || 
|-id=161 bgcolor=#d6d6d6
| 115161 ||  || — || September 18, 2003 || Kitt Peak || Spacewatch || THM || align=right | 4.8 km || 
|-id=162 bgcolor=#fefefe
| 115162 ||  || — || September 18, 2003 || Kitt Peak || Spacewatch || NYS || align=right | 1.4 km || 
|-id=163 bgcolor=#d6d6d6
| 115163 ||  || — || September 18, 2003 || Kitt Peak || Spacewatch || THM || align=right | 4.3 km || 
|-id=164 bgcolor=#fefefe
| 115164 ||  || — || September 19, 2003 || Kitt Peak || Spacewatch || — || align=right | 1.1 km || 
|-id=165 bgcolor=#d6d6d6
| 115165 ||  || — || September 19, 2003 || Kitt Peak || Spacewatch || THM || align=right | 5.9 km || 
|-id=166 bgcolor=#fefefe
| 115166 ||  || — || September 19, 2003 || Kitt Peak || Spacewatch || — || align=right | 1.3 km || 
|-id=167 bgcolor=#fefefe
| 115167 ||  || — || September 19, 2003 || Kitt Peak || Spacewatch || — || align=right | 1.4 km || 
|-id=168 bgcolor=#fefefe
| 115168 ||  || — || September 19, 2003 || Haleakala || NEAT || — || align=right | 2.0 km || 
|-id=169 bgcolor=#E9E9E9
| 115169 ||  || — || September 19, 2003 || Kitt Peak || Spacewatch || — || align=right | 1.9 km || 
|-id=170 bgcolor=#d6d6d6
| 115170 ||  || — || September 19, 2003 || Kitt Peak || Spacewatch || HIL3:2 || align=right | 10 km || 
|-id=171 bgcolor=#fefefe
| 115171 ||  || — || September 19, 2003 || Haleakala || NEAT || — || align=right | 1.9 km || 
|-id=172 bgcolor=#fefefe
| 115172 ||  || — || September 18, 2003 || Socorro || LINEAR || — || align=right | 1.2 km || 
|-id=173 bgcolor=#fefefe
| 115173 ||  || — || September 18, 2003 || Palomar || NEAT || — || align=right | 1.3 km || 
|-id=174 bgcolor=#E9E9E9
| 115174 ||  || — || September 17, 2003 || Socorro || LINEAR || — || align=right | 2.5 km || 
|-id=175 bgcolor=#fefefe
| 115175 ||  || — || September 17, 2003 || Socorro || LINEAR || FLO || align=right | 1.3 km || 
|-id=176 bgcolor=#d6d6d6
| 115176 ||  || — || September 17, 2003 || Socorro || LINEAR || — || align=right | 3.6 km || 
|-id=177 bgcolor=#d6d6d6
| 115177 ||  || — || September 17, 2003 || Haleakala || NEAT || EOS || align=right | 3.9 km || 
|-id=178 bgcolor=#d6d6d6
| 115178 ||  || — || September 18, 2003 || Anderson Mesa || LONEOS || EOS || align=right | 4.6 km || 
|-id=179 bgcolor=#E9E9E9
| 115179 ||  || — || September 18, 2003 || Palomar || NEAT || — || align=right | 2.6 km || 
|-id=180 bgcolor=#E9E9E9
| 115180 ||  || — || September 18, 2003 || Socorro || LINEAR || — || align=right | 5.7 km || 
|-id=181 bgcolor=#E9E9E9
| 115181 ||  || — || September 18, 2003 || Palomar || NEAT || PAD || align=right | 3.3 km || 
|-id=182 bgcolor=#E9E9E9
| 115182 ||  || — || September 18, 2003 || Kitt Peak || Spacewatch || — || align=right | 2.5 km || 
|-id=183 bgcolor=#d6d6d6
| 115183 ||  || — || September 19, 2003 || Campo Imperatore || CINEOS || — || align=right | 7.1 km || 
|-id=184 bgcolor=#fefefe
| 115184 ||  || — || September 19, 2003 || Palomar || NEAT || V || align=right | 1.4 km || 
|-id=185 bgcolor=#d6d6d6
| 115185 ||  || — || September 19, 2003 || Socorro || LINEAR || — || align=right | 4.0 km || 
|-id=186 bgcolor=#fefefe
| 115186 ||  || — || September 19, 2003 || Socorro || LINEAR || MAS || align=right | 1.4 km || 
|-id=187 bgcolor=#fefefe
| 115187 ||  || — || September 20, 2003 || Socorro || LINEAR || — || align=right | 1.3 km || 
|-id=188 bgcolor=#d6d6d6
| 115188 ||  || — || September 20, 2003 || Socorro || LINEAR || — || align=right | 4.7 km || 
|-id=189 bgcolor=#fefefe
| 115189 ||  || — || September 20, 2003 || Socorro || LINEAR || — || align=right | 1.4 km || 
|-id=190 bgcolor=#E9E9E9
| 115190 ||  || — || September 20, 2003 || Palomar || NEAT || — || align=right | 2.4 km || 
|-id=191 bgcolor=#E9E9E9
| 115191 ||  || — || September 20, 2003 || Haleakala || NEAT || — || align=right | 4.6 km || 
|-id=192 bgcolor=#fefefe
| 115192 ||  || — || September 20, 2003 || Farpoint || Farpoint Obs. || — || align=right | 1.5 km || 
|-id=193 bgcolor=#E9E9E9
| 115193 ||  || — || September 20, 2003 || Palomar || NEAT || — || align=right | 3.6 km || 
|-id=194 bgcolor=#fefefe
| 115194 ||  || — || September 20, 2003 || Palomar || NEAT || — || align=right | 2.7 km || 
|-id=195 bgcolor=#d6d6d6
| 115195 ||  || — || September 20, 2003 || Palomar || NEAT || — || align=right | 7.5 km || 
|-id=196 bgcolor=#d6d6d6
| 115196 ||  || — || September 20, 2003 || Kitt Peak || Spacewatch || EMA || align=right | 7.2 km || 
|-id=197 bgcolor=#E9E9E9
| 115197 ||  || — || September 20, 2003 || Kitt Peak || Spacewatch || ADE || align=right | 5.5 km || 
|-id=198 bgcolor=#E9E9E9
| 115198 ||  || — || September 20, 2003 || Palomar || NEAT || — || align=right | 3.6 km || 
|-id=199 bgcolor=#fefefe
| 115199 ||  || — || September 20, 2003 || Palomar || NEAT || H || align=right data-sort-value="0.92" | 920 m || 
|-id=200 bgcolor=#E9E9E9
| 115200 ||  || — || September 20, 2003 || Palomar || NEAT || HNS || align=right | 3.2 km || 
|}

115201–115300 

|-bgcolor=#E9E9E9
| 115201 ||  || — || September 19, 2003 || Palomar || NEAT || — || align=right | 3.9 km || 
|-id=202 bgcolor=#fefefe
| 115202 ||  || — || September 18, 2003 || Socorro || LINEAR || V || align=right | 1.1 km || 
|-id=203 bgcolor=#d6d6d6
| 115203 ||  || — || September 16, 2003 || Socorro || LINEAR || — || align=right | 4.9 km || 
|-id=204 bgcolor=#E9E9E9
| 115204 ||  || — || September 16, 2003 || Palomar || NEAT || EUN || align=right | 2.1 km || 
|-id=205 bgcolor=#E9E9E9
| 115205 ||  || — || September 16, 2003 || Palomar || NEAT || GEF || align=right | 2.9 km || 
|-id=206 bgcolor=#fefefe
| 115206 ||  || — || September 16, 2003 || Palomar || NEAT || — || align=right | 1.9 km || 
|-id=207 bgcolor=#d6d6d6
| 115207 ||  || — || September 17, 2003 || Anderson Mesa || LONEOS || — || align=right | 5.7 km || 
|-id=208 bgcolor=#fefefe
| 115208 ||  || — || September 17, 2003 || Kitt Peak || Spacewatch || V || align=right | 1.4 km || 
|-id=209 bgcolor=#d6d6d6
| 115209 ||  || — || September 18, 2003 || Palomar || NEAT || — || align=right | 5.2 km || 
|-id=210 bgcolor=#E9E9E9
| 115210 ||  || — || September 19, 2003 || Majorca || OAM Obs. || EUN || align=right | 3.3 km || 
|-id=211 bgcolor=#d6d6d6
| 115211 ||  || — || September 19, 2003 || Socorro || LINEAR || VER || align=right | 8.2 km || 
|-id=212 bgcolor=#E9E9E9
| 115212 ||  || — || September 19, 2003 || Socorro || LINEAR || — || align=right | 4.7 km || 
|-id=213 bgcolor=#d6d6d6
| 115213 ||  || — || September 19, 2003 || Haleakala || NEAT || KOR || align=right | 2.7 km || 
|-id=214 bgcolor=#E9E9E9
| 115214 ||  || — || September 20, 2003 || Socorro || LINEAR || DOR || align=right | 5.4 km || 
|-id=215 bgcolor=#fefefe
| 115215 ||  || — || September 20, 2003 || Palomar || NEAT || NYS || align=right | 1.4 km || 
|-id=216 bgcolor=#fefefe
| 115216 ||  || — || September 20, 2003 || Socorro || LINEAR || H || align=right | 1.3 km || 
|-id=217 bgcolor=#d6d6d6
| 115217 ||  || — || September 20, 2003 || Palomar || NEAT || HYG || align=right | 5.0 km || 
|-id=218 bgcolor=#d6d6d6
| 115218 ||  || — || September 19, 2003 || Campo Imperatore || CINEOS || — || align=right | 8.4 km || 
|-id=219 bgcolor=#fefefe
| 115219 ||  || — || September 19, 2003 || Socorro || LINEAR || V || align=right | 1.2 km || 
|-id=220 bgcolor=#fefefe
| 115220 ||  || — || September 19, 2003 || Palomar || NEAT || — || align=right | 4.5 km || 
|-id=221 bgcolor=#E9E9E9
| 115221 ||  || — || September 19, 2003 || Palomar || NEAT || — || align=right | 3.9 km || 
|-id=222 bgcolor=#fefefe
| 115222 ||  || — || September 20, 2003 || Palomar || NEAT || — || align=right | 2.2 km || 
|-id=223 bgcolor=#E9E9E9
| 115223 ||  || — || September 20, 2003 || Socorro || LINEAR || — || align=right | 4.7 km || 
|-id=224 bgcolor=#d6d6d6
| 115224 ||  || — || September 20, 2003 || Socorro || LINEAR || — || align=right | 3.1 km || 
|-id=225 bgcolor=#E9E9E9
| 115225 ||  || — || September 20, 2003 || Socorro || LINEAR || GEF || align=right | 3.3 km || 
|-id=226 bgcolor=#d6d6d6
| 115226 ||  || — || September 20, 2003 || Socorro || LINEAR || — || align=right | 7.6 km || 
|-id=227 bgcolor=#fefefe
| 115227 ||  || — || September 20, 2003 || Socorro || LINEAR || FLO || align=right | 1.3 km || 
|-id=228 bgcolor=#fefefe
| 115228 ||  || — || September 20, 2003 || Palomar || NEAT || — || align=right | 1.5 km || 
|-id=229 bgcolor=#E9E9E9
| 115229 ||  || — || September 21, 2003 || Socorro || LINEAR || AGN || align=right | 3.0 km || 
|-id=230 bgcolor=#d6d6d6
| 115230 ||  || — || September 21, 2003 || Socorro || LINEAR || HYG || align=right | 5.4 km || 
|-id=231 bgcolor=#d6d6d6
| 115231 ||  || — || September 21, 2003 || Socorro || LINEAR || HYG || align=right | 8.0 km || 
|-id=232 bgcolor=#d6d6d6
| 115232 ||  || — || September 19, 2003 || Palomar || NEAT || TIR || align=right | 3.4 km || 
|-id=233 bgcolor=#E9E9E9
| 115233 ||  || — || September 20, 2003 || Campo Imperatore || CINEOS || AGN || align=right | 3.0 km || 
|-id=234 bgcolor=#E9E9E9
| 115234 ||  || — || September 20, 2003 || Palomar || NEAT || — || align=right | 3.7 km || 
|-id=235 bgcolor=#d6d6d6
| 115235 ||  || — || September 20, 2003 || Palomar || NEAT || — || align=right | 7.7 km || 
|-id=236 bgcolor=#E9E9E9
| 115236 ||  || — || September 20, 2003 || Palomar || NEAT || — || align=right | 3.6 km || 
|-id=237 bgcolor=#fefefe
| 115237 ||  || — || September 20, 2003 || Palomar || NEAT || — || align=right | 2.0 km || 
|-id=238 bgcolor=#fefefe
| 115238 ||  || — || September 21, 2003 || Kitt Peak || Spacewatch || — || align=right | 1.6 km || 
|-id=239 bgcolor=#fefefe
| 115239 ||  || — || September 21, 2003 || Kitt Peak || Spacewatch || — || align=right | 2.0 km || 
|-id=240 bgcolor=#d6d6d6
| 115240 ||  || — || September 16, 2003 || Socorro || LINEAR || — || align=right | 3.3 km || 
|-id=241 bgcolor=#fefefe
| 115241 ||  || — || September 17, 2003 || Socorro || LINEAR || V || align=right | 1.3 km || 
|-id=242 bgcolor=#fefefe
| 115242 ||  || — || September 18, 2003 || Kitt Peak || Spacewatch || — || align=right | 1.2 km || 
|-id=243 bgcolor=#d6d6d6
| 115243 ||  || — || September 19, 2003 || Anderson Mesa || LONEOS || — || align=right | 6.1 km || 
|-id=244 bgcolor=#E9E9E9
| 115244 ||  || — || September 19, 2003 || Anderson Mesa || LONEOS || — || align=right | 5.1 km || 
|-id=245 bgcolor=#E9E9E9
| 115245 ||  || — || September 19, 2003 || Anderson Mesa || LONEOS || WIT || align=right | 2.2 km || 
|-id=246 bgcolor=#d6d6d6
| 115246 ||  || — || September 19, 2003 || Anderson Mesa || LONEOS || — || align=right | 4.1 km || 
|-id=247 bgcolor=#fefefe
| 115247 ||  || — || September 19, 2003 || Anderson Mesa || LONEOS || MAS || align=right | 1.00 km || 
|-id=248 bgcolor=#fefefe
| 115248 ||  || — || September 19, 2003 || Anderson Mesa || LONEOS || MAS || align=right | 1.5 km || 
|-id=249 bgcolor=#d6d6d6
| 115249 ||  || — || September 19, 2003 || Anderson Mesa || LONEOS || — || align=right | 4.0 km || 
|-id=250 bgcolor=#fefefe
| 115250 ||  || — || September 19, 2003 || Anderson Mesa || LONEOS || — || align=right | 1.4 km || 
|-id=251 bgcolor=#d6d6d6
| 115251 ||  || — || September 19, 2003 || Anderson Mesa || LONEOS || KOR || align=right | 3.1 km || 
|-id=252 bgcolor=#d6d6d6
| 115252 ||  || — || September 19, 2003 || Anderson Mesa || LONEOS || — || align=right | 4.3 km || 
|-id=253 bgcolor=#E9E9E9
| 115253 ||  || — || September 19, 2003 || Anderson Mesa || LONEOS || AGN || align=right | 3.1 km || 
|-id=254 bgcolor=#E9E9E9
| 115254 Fényi ||  ||  || September 22, 2003 || Piszkéstető || K. Sárneczky, B. Sipőcz || — || align=right | 4.1 km || 
|-id=255 bgcolor=#E9E9E9
| 115255 ||  || — || September 16, 2003 || Kitt Peak || Spacewatch || — || align=right | 3.3 km || 
|-id=256 bgcolor=#d6d6d6
| 115256 ||  || — || September 19, 2003 || Socorro || LINEAR || HYG || align=right | 5.9 km || 
|-id=257 bgcolor=#d6d6d6
| 115257 ||  || — || September 19, 2003 || Kitt Peak || Spacewatch || LIX || align=right | 7.1 km || 
|-id=258 bgcolor=#fefefe
| 115258 ||  || — || September 20, 2003 || Anderson Mesa || LONEOS || — || align=right | 1.6 km || 
|-id=259 bgcolor=#E9E9E9
| 115259 ||  || — || September 20, 2003 || Anderson Mesa || LONEOS || AGN || align=right | 2.4 km || 
|-id=260 bgcolor=#d6d6d6
| 115260 ||  || — || September 22, 2003 || Haleakala || NEAT || — || align=right | 3.3 km || 
|-id=261 bgcolor=#E9E9E9
| 115261 ||  || — || September 23, 2003 || Haleakala || NEAT || INO || align=right | 3.3 km || 
|-id=262 bgcolor=#d6d6d6
| 115262 ||  || — || September 18, 2003 || Socorro || LINEAR || — || align=right | 6.3 km || 
|-id=263 bgcolor=#fefefe
| 115263 ||  || — || September 18, 2003 || Socorro || LINEAR || — || align=right | 1.4 km || 
|-id=264 bgcolor=#E9E9E9
| 115264 ||  || — || September 18, 2003 || Socorro || LINEAR || — || align=right | 1.3 km || 
|-id=265 bgcolor=#fefefe
| 115265 ||  || — || September 18, 2003 || Socorro || LINEAR || — || align=right | 1.6 km || 
|-id=266 bgcolor=#d6d6d6
| 115266 ||  || — || September 18, 2003 || Socorro || LINEAR || — || align=right | 4.4 km || 
|-id=267 bgcolor=#fefefe
| 115267 ||  || — || September 18, 2003 || Palomar || NEAT || — || align=right | 1.5 km || 
|-id=268 bgcolor=#d6d6d6
| 115268 ||  || — || September 18, 2003 || Palomar || NEAT || — || align=right | 5.1 km || 
|-id=269 bgcolor=#fefefe
| 115269 ||  || — || September 18, 2003 || Palomar || NEAT || — || align=right | 1.2 km || 
|-id=270 bgcolor=#fefefe
| 115270 ||  || — || September 19, 2003 || Socorro || LINEAR || — || align=right | 4.0 km || 
|-id=271 bgcolor=#E9E9E9
| 115271 ||  || — || September 19, 2003 || Kitt Peak || Spacewatch || RAF || align=right | 3.0 km || 
|-id=272 bgcolor=#fefefe
| 115272 ||  || — || September 20, 2003 || Anderson Mesa || LONEOS || — || align=right | 1.7 km || 
|-id=273 bgcolor=#E9E9E9
| 115273 ||  || — || September 20, 2003 || Socorro || LINEAR || — || align=right | 5.4 km || 
|-id=274 bgcolor=#fefefe
| 115274 ||  || — || September 20, 2003 || Socorro || LINEAR || — || align=right | 2.0 km || 
|-id=275 bgcolor=#d6d6d6
| 115275 ||  || — || September 21, 2003 || Pla D'Arguines || Pla D'Arguines Obs. || — || align=right | 6.9 km || 
|-id=276 bgcolor=#fefefe
| 115276 ||  || — || September 21, 2003 || Kitt Peak || Spacewatch || — || align=right | 1.7 km || 
|-id=277 bgcolor=#E9E9E9
| 115277 ||  || — || September 22, 2003 || Anderson Mesa || LONEOS || — || align=right | 2.5 km || 
|-id=278 bgcolor=#E9E9E9
| 115278 ||  || — || September 22, 2003 || Anderson Mesa || LONEOS || — || align=right | 3.4 km || 
|-id=279 bgcolor=#fefefe
| 115279 ||  || — || September 22, 2003 || Anderson Mesa || LONEOS || — || align=right | 1.6 km || 
|-id=280 bgcolor=#fefefe
| 115280 ||  || — || September 22, 2003 || Anderson Mesa || LONEOS || V || align=right | 1.2 km || 
|-id=281 bgcolor=#d6d6d6
| 115281 ||  || — || September 22, 2003 || Palomar || NEAT || HYG || align=right | 5.4 km || 
|-id=282 bgcolor=#d6d6d6
| 115282 ||  || — || September 24, 2003 || Palomar || NEAT || EOS || align=right | 3.3 km || 
|-id=283 bgcolor=#fefefe
| 115283 ||  || — || September 17, 2003 || Kitt Peak || Spacewatch || — || align=right | 1.6 km || 
|-id=284 bgcolor=#d6d6d6
| 115284 ||  || — || September 20, 2003 || Socorro || LINEAR || — || align=right | 7.7 km || 
|-id=285 bgcolor=#d6d6d6
| 115285 ||  || — || September 20, 2003 || Haleakala || NEAT || EOS || align=right | 4.0 km || 
|-id=286 bgcolor=#d6d6d6
| 115286 ||  || — || September 20, 2003 || Haleakala || NEAT || — || align=right | 7.8 km || 
|-id=287 bgcolor=#E9E9E9
| 115287 ||  || — || September 20, 2003 || Palomar || NEAT || — || align=right | 5.7 km || 
|-id=288 bgcolor=#fefefe
| 115288 ||  || — || September 20, 2003 || Kitt Peak || Spacewatch || — || align=right | 1.4 km || 
|-id=289 bgcolor=#d6d6d6
| 115289 ||  || — || September 20, 2003 || Kitt Peak || Spacewatch || — || align=right | 4.0 km || 
|-id=290 bgcolor=#d6d6d6
| 115290 ||  || — || September 21, 2003 || Anderson Mesa || LONEOS || — || align=right | 2.1 km || 
|-id=291 bgcolor=#E9E9E9
| 115291 ||  || — || September 21, 2003 || Anderson Mesa || LONEOS || WIT || align=right | 1.9 km || 
|-id=292 bgcolor=#d6d6d6
| 115292 ||  || — || September 21, 2003 || Anderson Mesa || LONEOS || — || align=right | 7.8 km || 
|-id=293 bgcolor=#fefefe
| 115293 ||  || — || September 21, 2003 || Anderson Mesa || LONEOS || — || align=right | 1.8 km || 
|-id=294 bgcolor=#d6d6d6
| 115294 ||  || — || September 21, 2003 || Anderson Mesa || LONEOS || — || align=right | 8.2 km || 
|-id=295 bgcolor=#E9E9E9
| 115295 ||  || — || September 21, 2003 || Anderson Mesa || LONEOS || HNS || align=right | 3.3 km || 
|-id=296 bgcolor=#E9E9E9
| 115296 ||  || — || September 25, 2003 || Palomar || NEAT || — || align=right | 3.0 km || 
|-id=297 bgcolor=#d6d6d6
| 115297 ||  || — || September 24, 2003 || Socorro || LINEAR || — || align=right | 7.4 km || 
|-id=298 bgcolor=#d6d6d6
| 115298 ||  || — || September 22, 2003 || Palomar || NEAT || — || align=right | 4.0 km || 
|-id=299 bgcolor=#d6d6d6
| 115299 ||  || — || September 22, 2003 || Socorro || LINEAR || EUP || align=right | 9.9 km || 
|-id=300 bgcolor=#E9E9E9
| 115300 ||  || — || September 22, 2003 || Socorro || LINEAR || — || align=right | 2.7 km || 
|}

115301–115400 

|-bgcolor=#E9E9E9
| 115301 ||  || — || September 25, 2003 || Haleakala || NEAT || — || align=right | 2.7 km || 
|-id=302 bgcolor=#fefefe
| 115302 ||  || — || September 26, 2003 || Socorro || LINEAR || — || align=right | 1.6 km || 
|-id=303 bgcolor=#fefefe
| 115303 ||  || — || September 26, 2003 || Socorro || LINEAR || — || align=right | 1.8 km || 
|-id=304 bgcolor=#fefefe
| 115304 ||  || — || September 26, 2003 || Socorro || LINEAR || — || align=right | 1.3 km || 
|-id=305 bgcolor=#fefefe
| 115305 ||  || — || September 24, 2003 || Kvistaberg || UDAS || V || align=right | 1.2 km || 
|-id=306 bgcolor=#d6d6d6
| 115306 ||  || — || September 26, 2003 || Socorro || LINEAR || URS || align=right | 7.8 km || 
|-id=307 bgcolor=#E9E9E9
| 115307 ||  || — || September 26, 2003 || Socorro || LINEAR || — || align=right | 3.2 km || 
|-id=308 bgcolor=#fefefe
| 115308 ||  || — || September 24, 2003 || Palomar || NEAT || FLO || align=right | 1.1 km || 
|-id=309 bgcolor=#d6d6d6
| 115309 ||  || — || September 25, 2003 || Palomar || NEAT || EOS || align=right | 4.5 km || 
|-id=310 bgcolor=#d6d6d6
| 115310 ||  || — || September 26, 2003 || Socorro || LINEAR || KOR || align=right | 2.9 km || 
|-id=311 bgcolor=#d6d6d6
| 115311 ||  || — || September 26, 2003 || Desert Eagle || W. K. Y. Yeung || KOR || align=right | 2.4 km || 
|-id=312 bgcolor=#fefefe
| 115312 Whither ||  ||  || September 19, 2003 || Wrightwood || J. W. Young || CLA || align=right | 3.4 km || 
|-id=313 bgcolor=#d6d6d6
| 115313 ||  || — || September 25, 2003 || Haleakala || NEAT || — || align=right | 6.4 km || 
|-id=314 bgcolor=#d6d6d6
| 115314 ||  || — || September 25, 2003 || Haleakala || NEAT || THM || align=right | 5.3 km || 
|-id=315 bgcolor=#d6d6d6
| 115315 ||  || — || September 25, 2003 || Haleakala || NEAT || 3:2 || align=right | 9.2 km || 
|-id=316 bgcolor=#E9E9E9
| 115316 ||  || — || September 26, 2003 || Socorro || LINEAR || — || align=right | 4.9 km || 
|-id=317 bgcolor=#d6d6d6
| 115317 ||  || — || September 27, 2003 || Desert Eagle || W. K. Y. Yeung || KOR || align=right | 3.1 km || 
|-id=318 bgcolor=#E9E9E9
| 115318 ||  || — || September 27, 2003 || Desert Eagle || W. K. Y. Yeung || HOF || align=right | 4.9 km || 
|-id=319 bgcolor=#fefefe
| 115319 ||  || — || September 28, 2003 || Desert Eagle || W. K. Y. Yeung || NYS || align=right | 2.5 km || 
|-id=320 bgcolor=#E9E9E9
| 115320 ||  || — || September 19, 2003 || Palomar || NEAT || — || align=right | 2.4 km || 
|-id=321 bgcolor=#E9E9E9
| 115321 ||  || — || September 28, 2003 || Socorro || LINEAR || — || align=right | 9.6 km || 
|-id=322 bgcolor=#fefefe
| 115322 ||  || — || September 26, 2003 || Socorro || LINEAR || NYS || align=right | 1.2 km || 
|-id=323 bgcolor=#E9E9E9
| 115323 ||  || — || September 27, 2003 || Desert Eagle || W. K. Y. Yeung || — || align=right | 1.5 km || 
|-id=324 bgcolor=#E9E9E9
| 115324 ||  || — || September 29, 2003 || Desert Eagle || W. K. Y. Yeung || GEF || align=right | 2.9 km || 
|-id=325 bgcolor=#d6d6d6
| 115325 ||  || — || September 29, 2003 || Desert Eagle || W. K. Y. Yeung || SYL7:4 || align=right | 8.5 km || 
|-id=326 bgcolor=#E9E9E9
| 115326 Wehinger ||  ||  || September 29, 2003 || Junk Bond || D. Healy || XIZ || align=right | 3.4 km || 
|-id=327 bgcolor=#E9E9E9
| 115327 ||  || — || September 27, 2003 || Desert Eagle || W. K. Y. Yeung || — || align=right | 3.0 km || 
|-id=328 bgcolor=#d6d6d6
| 115328 ||  || — || September 28, 2003 || Fountain Hills || C. W. Juels, P. R. Holvorcem || — || align=right | 6.7 km || 
|-id=329 bgcolor=#d6d6d6
| 115329 ||  || — || September 27, 2003 || Desert Eagle || W. K. Y. Yeung || EOS || align=right | 3.2 km || 
|-id=330 bgcolor=#fefefe
| 115330 ||  || — || September 22, 2003 || Socorro || LINEAR || — || align=right | 1.6 km || 
|-id=331 bgcolor=#E9E9E9
| 115331 Shrylmiles ||  ||  || September 29, 2003 || Junk Bond || D. Healy || — || align=right | 4.3 km || 
|-id=332 bgcolor=#fefefe
| 115332 ||  || — || September 28, 2003 || Anderson Mesa || LONEOS || NYS || align=right | 3.2 km || 
|-id=333 bgcolor=#fefefe
| 115333 ||  || — || September 26, 2003 || Socorro || LINEAR || — || align=right | 1.1 km || 
|-id=334 bgcolor=#d6d6d6
| 115334 ||  || — || September 26, 2003 || Socorro || LINEAR || — || align=right | 4.4 km || 
|-id=335 bgcolor=#E9E9E9
| 115335 ||  || — || September 26, 2003 || Socorro || LINEAR || — || align=right | 3.5 km || 
|-id=336 bgcolor=#fefefe
| 115336 ||  || — || September 26, 2003 || Socorro || LINEAR || — || align=right | 1.7 km || 
|-id=337 bgcolor=#d6d6d6
| 115337 ||  || — || September 26, 2003 || Socorro || LINEAR || — || align=right | 3.8 km || 
|-id=338 bgcolor=#E9E9E9
| 115338 ||  || — || September 26, 2003 || Socorro || LINEAR || PAD || align=right | 3.6 km || 
|-id=339 bgcolor=#fefefe
| 115339 ||  || — || September 26, 2003 || Socorro || LINEAR || FLO || align=right | 1.2 km || 
|-id=340 bgcolor=#d6d6d6
| 115340 ||  || — || September 26, 2003 || Socorro || LINEAR || 3:2 || align=right | 5.2 km || 
|-id=341 bgcolor=#d6d6d6
| 115341 ||  || — || September 26, 2003 || Socorro || LINEAR || — || align=right | 4.7 km || 
|-id=342 bgcolor=#E9E9E9
| 115342 ||  || — || September 27, 2003 || Socorro || LINEAR || — || align=right | 3.1 km || 
|-id=343 bgcolor=#E9E9E9
| 115343 ||  || — || September 26, 2003 || Socorro || LINEAR || — || align=right | 3.0 km || 
|-id=344 bgcolor=#fefefe
| 115344 ||  || — || September 26, 2003 || Socorro || LINEAR || FLO || align=right | 1.5 km || 
|-id=345 bgcolor=#fefefe
| 115345 ||  || — || September 27, 2003 || Kitt Peak || Spacewatch || MAS || align=right | 1.3 km || 
|-id=346 bgcolor=#fefefe
| 115346 ||  || — || September 24, 2003 || Palomar || NEAT || V || align=right | 1.3 km || 
|-id=347 bgcolor=#E9E9E9
| 115347 ||  || — || September 24, 2003 || Haleakala || NEAT || — || align=right | 4.7 km || 
|-id=348 bgcolor=#d6d6d6
| 115348 ||  || — || September 25, 2003 || Haleakala || NEAT || TIR || align=right | 3.5 km || 
|-id=349 bgcolor=#d6d6d6
| 115349 ||  || — || September 25, 2003 || Haleakala || NEAT || — || align=right | 6.3 km || 
|-id=350 bgcolor=#d6d6d6
| 115350 ||  || — || September 25, 2003 || Črni Vrh || Črni Vrh || — || align=right | 4.1 km || 
|-id=351 bgcolor=#fefefe
| 115351 ||  || — || September 26, 2003 || Socorro || LINEAR || — || align=right | 1.5 km || 
|-id=352 bgcolor=#d6d6d6
| 115352 ||  || — || September 27, 2003 || Socorro || LINEAR || — || align=right | 4.7 km || 
|-id=353 bgcolor=#d6d6d6
| 115353 ||  || — || September 25, 2003 || Haleakala || NEAT || — || align=right | 9.2 km || 
|-id=354 bgcolor=#E9E9E9
| 115354 ||  || — || September 26, 2003 || Socorro || LINEAR || — || align=right | 1.6 km || 
|-id=355 bgcolor=#d6d6d6
| 115355 ||  || — || September 26, 2003 || Socorro || LINEAR || THM || align=right | 5.3 km || 
|-id=356 bgcolor=#d6d6d6
| 115356 ||  || — || September 26, 2003 || Socorro || LINEAR || — || align=right | 3.9 km || 
|-id=357 bgcolor=#fefefe
| 115357 ||  || — || September 26, 2003 || Socorro || LINEAR || NYS || align=right | 1.1 km || 
|-id=358 bgcolor=#fefefe
| 115358 ||  || — || September 26, 2003 || Socorro || LINEAR || V || align=right | 1.3 km || 
|-id=359 bgcolor=#d6d6d6
| 115359 ||  || — || September 26, 2003 || Socorro || LINEAR || — || align=right | 5.5 km || 
|-id=360 bgcolor=#d6d6d6
| 115360 ||  || — || September 26, 2003 || Socorro || LINEAR || EOS || align=right | 9.3 km || 
|-id=361 bgcolor=#fefefe
| 115361 ||  || — || September 26, 2003 || Socorro || LINEAR || — || align=right | 1.6 km || 
|-id=362 bgcolor=#fefefe
| 115362 ||  || — || September 26, 2003 || Socorro || LINEAR || FLO || align=right | 1.3 km || 
|-id=363 bgcolor=#fefefe
| 115363 ||  || — || September 26, 2003 || Socorro || LINEAR || SUL || align=right | 2.3 km || 
|-id=364 bgcolor=#d6d6d6
| 115364 ||  || — || September 26, 2003 || Socorro || LINEAR || — || align=right | 4.8 km || 
|-id=365 bgcolor=#fefefe
| 115365 ||  || — || September 26, 2003 || Socorro || LINEAR || — || align=right | 1.5 km || 
|-id=366 bgcolor=#d6d6d6
| 115366 ||  || — || September 26, 2003 || Socorro || LINEAR || — || align=right | 5.6 km || 
|-id=367 bgcolor=#fefefe
| 115367 ||  || — || September 26, 2003 || Socorro || LINEAR || NYS || align=right | 1.4 km || 
|-id=368 bgcolor=#E9E9E9
| 115368 ||  || — || September 26, 2003 || Socorro || LINEAR || — || align=right | 3.4 km || 
|-id=369 bgcolor=#d6d6d6
| 115369 ||  || — || September 26, 2003 || Socorro || LINEAR || — || align=right | 7.2 km || 
|-id=370 bgcolor=#E9E9E9
| 115370 ||  || — || September 27, 2003 || Kitt Peak || Spacewatch || — || align=right | 2.6 km || 
|-id=371 bgcolor=#E9E9E9
| 115371 ||  || — || September 27, 2003 || Kitt Peak || Spacewatch || — || align=right | 4.6 km || 
|-id=372 bgcolor=#fefefe
| 115372 ||  || — || September 27, 2003 || Kitt Peak || Spacewatch || MAS || align=right | 1.3 km || 
|-id=373 bgcolor=#d6d6d6
| 115373 ||  || — || September 28, 2003 || Kitt Peak || Spacewatch || — || align=right | 3.9 km || 
|-id=374 bgcolor=#fefefe
| 115374 ||  || — || September 28, 2003 || Kitt Peak || Spacewatch || NYS || align=right | 1.1 km || 
|-id=375 bgcolor=#d6d6d6
| 115375 ||  || — || September 28, 2003 || Kitt Peak || Spacewatch || KOR || align=right | 2.6 km || 
|-id=376 bgcolor=#fefefe
| 115376 ||  || — || September 27, 2003 || Kitt Peak || Spacewatch || FLO || align=right | 1.0 km || 
|-id=377 bgcolor=#d6d6d6
| 115377 ||  || — || September 24, 2003 || Haleakala || NEAT || — || align=right | 4.5 km || 
|-id=378 bgcolor=#E9E9E9
| 115378 ||  || — || September 25, 2003 || Palomar || NEAT || — || align=right | 3.5 km || 
|-id=379 bgcolor=#d6d6d6
| 115379 ||  || — || September 25, 2003 || Haleakala || NEAT || — || align=right | 3.7 km || 
|-id=380 bgcolor=#d6d6d6
| 115380 ||  || — || September 25, 2003 || Haleakala || NEAT || HIL3:2 || align=right | 9.8 km || 
|-id=381 bgcolor=#E9E9E9
| 115381 ||  || — || September 27, 2003 || Socorro || LINEAR || — || align=right | 1.8 km || 
|-id=382 bgcolor=#d6d6d6
| 115382 ||  || — || September 27, 2003 || Socorro || LINEAR || — || align=right | 4.0 km || 
|-id=383 bgcolor=#fefefe
| 115383 ||  || — || September 28, 2003 || Anderson Mesa || LONEOS || PHO || align=right | 1.7 km || 
|-id=384 bgcolor=#fefefe
| 115384 ||  || — || September 29, 2003 || Socorro || LINEAR || NYS || align=right | 1.3 km || 
|-id=385 bgcolor=#d6d6d6
| 115385 ||  || — || September 29, 2003 || Socorro || LINEAR || HYG || align=right | 5.3 km || 
|-id=386 bgcolor=#fefefe
| 115386 ||  || — || September 29, 2003 || Socorro || LINEAR || — || align=right | 1.3 km || 
|-id=387 bgcolor=#E9E9E9
| 115387 ||  || — || September 29, 2003 || Socorro || LINEAR || — || align=right | 3.4 km || 
|-id=388 bgcolor=#fefefe
| 115388 ||  || — || September 30, 2003 || Socorro || LINEAR || — || align=right | 1.6 km || 
|-id=389 bgcolor=#E9E9E9
| 115389 ||  || — || September 30, 2003 || Socorro || LINEAR || — || align=right | 3.2 km || 
|-id=390 bgcolor=#d6d6d6
| 115390 ||  || — || September 17, 2003 || Socorro || LINEAR || — || align=right | 3.4 km || 
|-id=391 bgcolor=#fefefe
| 115391 ||  || — || September 18, 2003 || Socorro || LINEAR || — || align=right | 1.7 km || 
|-id=392 bgcolor=#d6d6d6
| 115392 ||  || — || September 20, 2003 || Socorro || LINEAR || — || align=right | 8.0 km || 
|-id=393 bgcolor=#fefefe
| 115393 ||  || — || September 20, 2003 || Socorro || LINEAR || V || align=right | 1.4 km || 
|-id=394 bgcolor=#E9E9E9
| 115394 ||  || — || September 20, 2003 || Palomar || NEAT || — || align=right | 4.9 km || 
|-id=395 bgcolor=#d6d6d6
| 115395 ||  || — || September 21, 2003 || Palomar || NEAT || — || align=right | 3.8 km || 
|-id=396 bgcolor=#d6d6d6
| 115396 ||  || — || September 29, 2003 || Kitt Peak || Spacewatch || IMH || align=right | 5.6 km || 
|-id=397 bgcolor=#fefefe
| 115397 ||  || — || September 28, 2003 || Socorro || LINEAR || — || align=right | 1.2 km || 
|-id=398 bgcolor=#E9E9E9
| 115398 ||  || — || September 28, 2003 || Anderson Mesa || LONEOS || — || align=right | 2.8 km || 
|-id=399 bgcolor=#d6d6d6
| 115399 ||  || — || September 29, 2003 || Socorro || LINEAR || KOR || align=right | 3.0 km || 
|-id=400 bgcolor=#d6d6d6
| 115400 ||  || — || September 29, 2003 || Socorro || LINEAR || — || align=right | 4.8 km || 
|}

115401–115500 

|-bgcolor=#fefefe
| 115401 ||  || — || September 29, 2003 || Socorro || LINEAR || — || align=right | 1.6 km || 
|-id=402 bgcolor=#fefefe
| 115402 ||  || — || September 30, 2003 || Socorro || LINEAR || — || align=right | 2.1 km || 
|-id=403 bgcolor=#E9E9E9
| 115403 ||  || — || September 30, 2003 || Socorro || LINEAR || — || align=right | 2.3 km || 
|-id=404 bgcolor=#E9E9E9
| 115404 ||  || — || September 27, 2003 || Socorro || LINEAR || — || align=right | 2.6 km || 
|-id=405 bgcolor=#E9E9E9
| 115405 ||  || — || September 28, 2003 || Socorro || LINEAR || — || align=right | 3.6 km || 
|-id=406 bgcolor=#fefefe
| 115406 ||  || — || September 28, 2003 || Socorro || LINEAR || — || align=right | 1.6 km || 
|-id=407 bgcolor=#fefefe
| 115407 ||  || — || September 28, 2003 || Socorro || LINEAR || FLO || align=right | 1.5 km || 
|-id=408 bgcolor=#E9E9E9
| 115408 ||  || — || September 28, 2003 || Socorro || LINEAR || — || align=right | 5.9 km || 
|-id=409 bgcolor=#fefefe
| 115409 ||  || — || September 28, 2003 || Socorro || LINEAR || NYS || align=right | 1.5 km || 
|-id=410 bgcolor=#E9E9E9
| 115410 ||  || — || September 29, 2003 || Anderson Mesa || LONEOS || — || align=right | 2.4 km || 
|-id=411 bgcolor=#d6d6d6
| 115411 ||  || — || September 16, 2003 || Palomar || NEAT || — || align=right | 4.0 km || 
|-id=412 bgcolor=#fefefe
| 115412 ||  || — || September 18, 2003 || Haleakala || NEAT || PHO || align=right | 2.0 km || 
|-id=413 bgcolor=#d6d6d6
| 115413 ||  || — || September 29, 2003 || Anderson Mesa || LONEOS || URS || align=right | 6.4 km || 
|-id=414 bgcolor=#fefefe
| 115414 ||  || — || September 29, 2003 || Anderson Mesa || LONEOS || — || align=right | 4.0 km || 
|-id=415 bgcolor=#E9E9E9
| 115415 ||  || — || September 29, 2003 || Anderson Mesa || LONEOS || — || align=right | 3.8 km || 
|-id=416 bgcolor=#d6d6d6
| 115416 ||  || — || September 29, 2003 || Socorro || LINEAR || — || align=right | 8.3 km || 
|-id=417 bgcolor=#fefefe
| 115417 ||  || — || September 30, 2003 || Socorro || LINEAR || — || align=right | 3.2 km || 
|-id=418 bgcolor=#fefefe
| 115418 ||  || — || September 17, 2003 || Palomar || NEAT || — || align=right | 1.7 km || 
|-id=419 bgcolor=#fefefe
| 115419 ||  || — || September 17, 2003 || Palomar || NEAT || — || align=right | 2.9 km || 
|-id=420 bgcolor=#E9E9E9
| 115420 ||  || — || September 30, 2003 || Socorro || LINEAR || 526 || align=right | 4.2 km || 
|-id=421 bgcolor=#fefefe
| 115421 ||  || — || September 30, 2003 || Socorro || LINEAR || — || align=right | 2.1 km || 
|-id=422 bgcolor=#d6d6d6
| 115422 ||  || — || September 26, 2003 || Socorro || LINEAR || — || align=right | 6.4 km || 
|-id=423 bgcolor=#E9E9E9
| 115423 ||  || — || September 28, 2003 || Socorro || LINEAR || HNS || align=right | 2.7 km || 
|-id=424 bgcolor=#fefefe
| 115424 ||  || — || September 28, 2003 || Socorro || LINEAR || NYS || align=right | 1.5 km || 
|-id=425 bgcolor=#d6d6d6
| 115425 ||  || — || September 28, 2003 || Socorro || LINEAR || — || align=right | 7.3 km || 
|-id=426 bgcolor=#E9E9E9
| 115426 ||  || — || September 29, 2003 || Socorro || LINEAR || — || align=right | 3.7 km || 
|-id=427 bgcolor=#fefefe
| 115427 ||  || — || September 30, 2003 || Kitt Peak || Spacewatch || — || align=right | 2.5 km || 
|-id=428 bgcolor=#E9E9E9
| 115428 ||  || — || September 18, 2003 || Goodricke-Pigott || R. A. Tucker || — || align=right | 2.8 km || 
|-id=429 bgcolor=#d6d6d6
| 115429 ||  || — || September 17, 2003 || Socorro || LINEAR || TIR || align=right | 5.7 km || 
|-id=430 bgcolor=#E9E9E9
| 115430 ||  || — || September 26, 2003 || Palomar || NEAT || HNS || align=right | 2.2 km || 
|-id=431 bgcolor=#E9E9E9
| 115431 ||  || — || October 4, 2003 || Kingsnake || J. V. McClusky || MAR || align=right | 2.2 km || 
|-id=432 bgcolor=#d6d6d6
| 115432 ||  || — || October 1, 2003 || Goodricke-Pigott || J. W. Kessel || EOS || align=right | 4.4 km || 
|-id=433 bgcolor=#d6d6d6
| 115433 ||  || — || October 2, 2003 || Goodricke-Pigott || J. W. Kessel || THM || align=right | 5.8 km || 
|-id=434 bgcolor=#E9E9E9
| 115434 Kellyfast ||  ||  || October 5, 2003 || Goodricke-Pigott || V. Reddy || NEM || align=right | 2.9 km || 
|-id=435 bgcolor=#fefefe
| 115435 ||  || — || October 6, 2003 || Anderson Mesa || LONEOS || — || align=right | 4.5 km || 
|-id=436 bgcolor=#E9E9E9
| 115436 ||  || — || October 1, 2003 || Kitt Peak || Spacewatch || — || align=right | 4.5 km || 
|-id=437 bgcolor=#fefefe
| 115437 ||  || — || October 2, 2003 || Kitt Peak || Spacewatch || NYS || align=right | 3.4 km || 
|-id=438 bgcolor=#fefefe
| 115438 ||  || — || October 1, 2003 || Anderson Mesa || LONEOS || V || align=right | 1.3 km || 
|-id=439 bgcolor=#d6d6d6
| 115439 ||  || — || October 1, 2003 || Anderson Mesa || LONEOS || — || align=right | 5.4 km || 
|-id=440 bgcolor=#d6d6d6
| 115440 ||  || — || October 1, 2003 || Anderson Mesa || LONEOS || 3:2 || align=right | 16 km || 
|-id=441 bgcolor=#d6d6d6
| 115441 ||  || — || October 1, 2003 || Anderson Mesa || LONEOS || ALA || align=right | 7.4 km || 
|-id=442 bgcolor=#E9E9E9
| 115442 ||  || — || October 1, 2003 || Anderson Mesa || LONEOS || — || align=right | 4.0 km || 
|-id=443 bgcolor=#E9E9E9
| 115443 ||  || — || October 2, 2003 || Socorro || LINEAR || — || align=right | 5.1 km || 
|-id=444 bgcolor=#fefefe
| 115444 ||  || — || October 3, 2003 || Kitt Peak || Spacewatch || V || align=right | 1.6 km || 
|-id=445 bgcolor=#d6d6d6
| 115445 ||  || — || October 4, 2003 || Kitt Peak || Spacewatch || — || align=right | 4.7 km || 
|-id=446 bgcolor=#fefefe
| 115446 ||  || — || October 5, 2003 || Haleakala || NEAT || — || align=right | 1.4 km || 
|-id=447 bgcolor=#fefefe
| 115447 ||  || — || October 5, 2003 || Haleakala || NEAT || NYS || align=right | 1.3 km || 
|-id=448 bgcolor=#E9E9E9
| 115448 ||  || — || October 14, 2003 || Palomar || NEAT || — || align=right | 5.3 km || 
|-id=449 bgcolor=#E9E9E9
| 115449 Robson ||  ||  || October 14, 2003 || New Milford || John J. McCarthy Obs. || NEM || align=right | 4.4 km || 
|-id=450 bgcolor=#E9E9E9
| 115450 ||  || — || October 15, 2003 || Črni Vrh || Črni Vrh || — || align=right | 2.7 km || 
|-id=451 bgcolor=#d6d6d6
| 115451 ||  || — || October 15, 2003 || Palomar || NEAT || — || align=right | 4.7 km || 
|-id=452 bgcolor=#E9E9E9
| 115452 ||  || — || October 14, 2003 || Anderson Mesa || LONEOS || — || align=right | 6.1 km || 
|-id=453 bgcolor=#E9E9E9
| 115453 ||  || — || October 14, 2003 || Anderson Mesa || LONEOS || HOFslow || align=right | 5.5 km || 
|-id=454 bgcolor=#d6d6d6
| 115454 ||  || — || October 14, 2003 || Anderson Mesa || LONEOS || — || align=right | 4.1 km || 
|-id=455 bgcolor=#E9E9E9
| 115455 ||  || — || October 14, 2003 || Socorro || LINEAR || — || align=right | 10 km || 
|-id=456 bgcolor=#E9E9E9
| 115456 ||  || — || October 9, 2003 || Anderson Mesa || LONEOS || BRU || align=right | 4.1 km || 
|-id=457 bgcolor=#fefefe
| 115457 ||  || — || October 5, 2003 || Socorro || LINEAR || H || align=right | 1.1 km || 
|-id=458 bgcolor=#d6d6d6
| 115458 ||  || — || October 14, 2003 || Anderson Mesa || LONEOS || — || align=right | 6.0 km || 
|-id=459 bgcolor=#E9E9E9
| 115459 ||  || — || October 15, 2003 || Anderson Mesa || LONEOS || — || align=right | 2.5 km || 
|-id=460 bgcolor=#E9E9E9
| 115460 ||  || — || October 15, 2003 || Anderson Mesa || LONEOS || MRX || align=right | 2.6 km || 
|-id=461 bgcolor=#d6d6d6
| 115461 ||  || — || October 15, 2003 || Anderson Mesa || LONEOS || — || align=right | 7.4 km || 
|-id=462 bgcolor=#E9E9E9
| 115462 ||  || — || October 15, 2003 || Anderson Mesa || LONEOS || — || align=right | 2.4 km || 
|-id=463 bgcolor=#d6d6d6
| 115463 ||  || — || October 15, 2003 || Anderson Mesa || LONEOS || 3:2 || align=right | 10 km || 
|-id=464 bgcolor=#fefefe
| 115464 ||  || — || October 15, 2003 || Anderson Mesa || LONEOS || NYS || align=right | 3.3 km || 
|-id=465 bgcolor=#fefefe
| 115465 ||  || — || October 15, 2003 || Palomar || NEAT || V || align=right | 1.3 km || 
|-id=466 bgcolor=#fefefe
| 115466 ||  || — || October 15, 2003 || Palomar || NEAT || — || align=right | 1.9 km || 
|-id=467 bgcolor=#E9E9E9
| 115467 ||  || — || October 15, 2003 || Anderson Mesa || LONEOS || — || align=right | 5.6 km || 
|-id=468 bgcolor=#d6d6d6
| 115468 ||  || — || October 15, 2003 || Anderson Mesa || LONEOS || — || align=right | 6.7 km || 
|-id=469 bgcolor=#fefefe
| 115469 ||  || — || October 1, 2003 || Kitt Peak || Spacewatch || — || align=right | 1.3 km || 
|-id=470 bgcolor=#E9E9E9
| 115470 ||  || — || October 5, 2003 || Socorro || LINEAR || — || align=right | 3.7 km || 
|-id=471 bgcolor=#d6d6d6
| 115471 ||  || — || October 16, 2003 || Palomar || NEAT || — || align=right | 4.8 km || 
|-id=472 bgcolor=#d6d6d6
| 115472 ||  || — || October 16, 2003 || Kitt Peak || Spacewatch || — || align=right | 4.1 km || 
|-id=473 bgcolor=#fefefe
| 115473 ||  || — || October 17, 2003 || Socorro || LINEAR || H || align=right | 1.4 km || 
|-id=474 bgcolor=#d6d6d6
| 115474 ||  || — || October 16, 2003 || Palomar || NEAT || — || align=right | 8.1 km || 
|-id=475 bgcolor=#E9E9E9
| 115475 ||  || — || October 17, 2003 || Socorro || LINEAR || HNS || align=right | 2.4 km || 
|-id=476 bgcolor=#fefefe
| 115476 ||  || — || October 18, 2003 || Socorro || LINEAR || H || align=right | 1.4 km || 
|-id=477 bgcolor=#E9E9E9
| 115477 Brantanica ||  ||  || October 19, 2003 || Wrightwood || J. W. Young || — || align=right | 3.5 km || 
|-id=478 bgcolor=#fefefe
| 115478 ||  || — || October 16, 2003 || Socorro || LINEAR || H || align=right | 1.5 km || 
|-id=479 bgcolor=#d6d6d6
| 115479 ||  || — || October 19, 2003 || Anderson Mesa || LONEOS || TIR || align=right | 6.6 km || 
|-id=480 bgcolor=#E9E9E9
| 115480 ||  || — || October 19, 2003 || Kvistaberg || UDAS || — || align=right | 3.0 km || 
|-id=481 bgcolor=#fefefe
| 115481 ||  || — || October 20, 2003 || Palomar || NEAT || — || align=right | 1.3 km || 
|-id=482 bgcolor=#E9E9E9
| 115482 ||  || — || October 16, 2003 || Kitt Peak || Spacewatch || — || align=right | 5.0 km || 
|-id=483 bgcolor=#d6d6d6
| 115483 ||  || — || October 16, 2003 || Anderson Mesa || LONEOS || — || align=right | 5.4 km || 
|-id=484 bgcolor=#E9E9E9
| 115484 ||  || — || October 20, 2003 || Palomar || NEAT || — || align=right | 5.0 km || 
|-id=485 bgcolor=#E9E9E9
| 115485 ||  || — || October 22, 2003 || Wrightwood || J. W. Young || — || align=right | 1.8 km || 
|-id=486 bgcolor=#fefefe
| 115486 ||  || — || October 21, 2003 || Socorro || LINEAR || — || align=right | 1.3 km || 
|-id=487 bgcolor=#d6d6d6
| 115487 ||  || — || October 18, 2003 || Anderson Mesa || LONEOS || CHA || align=right | 4.4 km || 
|-id=488 bgcolor=#d6d6d6
| 115488 ||  || — || October 18, 2003 || Palomar || NEAT || ALA || align=right | 9.2 km || 
|-id=489 bgcolor=#fefefe
| 115489 ||  || — || October 18, 2003 || Kitt Peak || Spacewatch || V || align=right | 1.4 km || 
|-id=490 bgcolor=#fefefe
| 115490 ||  || — || October 20, 2003 || Kingsnake || J. V. McClusky || — || align=right | 1.7 km || 
|-id=491 bgcolor=#d6d6d6
| 115491 ||  || — || October 21, 2003 || Kingsnake || J. V. McClusky || — || align=right | 7.3 km || 
|-id=492 bgcolor=#d6d6d6
| 115492 Watonga ||  ||  || October 23, 2003 || Emerald Lane || L. Ball || — || align=right | 6.4 km || 
|-id=493 bgcolor=#fefefe
| 115493 ||  || — || October 22, 2003 || Kitt Peak || Spacewatch || EUT || align=right | 1.1 km || 
|-id=494 bgcolor=#d6d6d6
| 115494 ||  || — || October 17, 2003 || Anderson Mesa || LONEOS || — || align=right | 5.6 km || 
|-id=495 bgcolor=#fefefe
| 115495 ||  || — || October 21, 2003 || Socorro || LINEAR || NYS || align=right | 2.8 km || 
|-id=496 bgcolor=#d6d6d6
| 115496 ||  || — || October 24, 2003 || Socorro || LINEAR || HYG || align=right | 5.8 km || 
|-id=497 bgcolor=#d6d6d6
| 115497 ||  || — || October 24, 2003 || Socorro || LINEAR || — || align=right | 5.2 km || 
|-id=498 bgcolor=#fefefe
| 115498 ||  || — || October 25, 2003 || Goodricke-Pigott || R. A. Tucker || — || align=right | 1.9 km || 
|-id=499 bgcolor=#E9E9E9
| 115499 ||  || — || October 25, 2003 || Goodricke-Pigott || R. A. Tucker || — || align=right | 1.5 km || 
|-id=500 bgcolor=#E9E9E9
| 115500 ||  || — || October 23, 2003 || Goodricke-Pigott || R. A. Tucker || — || align=right | 4.0 km || 
|}

115501–115600 

|-bgcolor=#d6d6d6
| 115501 ||  || — || October 22, 2003 || Goodricke-Pigott || R. A. Tucker || EOS || align=right | 3.5 km || 
|-id=502 bgcolor=#d6d6d6
| 115502 ||  || — || October 22, 2003 || Goodricke-Pigott || R. A. Tucker || — || align=right | 4.7 km || 
|-id=503 bgcolor=#fefefe
| 115503 ||  || — || October 19, 2003 || Kitt Peak || Spacewatch || — || align=right | 1.8 km || 
|-id=504 bgcolor=#E9E9E9
| 115504 ||  || — || October 23, 2003 || Kvistaberg || UDAS || AST || align=right | 4.4 km || 
|-id=505 bgcolor=#E9E9E9
| 115505 ||  || — || October 16, 2003 || Kitt Peak || Spacewatch || MRX || align=right | 2.1 km || 
|-id=506 bgcolor=#E9E9E9
| 115506 ||  || — || October 16, 2003 || Anderson Mesa || LONEOS || — || align=right | 5.1 km || 
|-id=507 bgcolor=#E9E9E9
| 115507 ||  || — || October 16, 2003 || Palomar || NEAT || — || align=right | 4.0 km || 
|-id=508 bgcolor=#d6d6d6
| 115508 ||  || — || October 16, 2003 || Palomar || NEAT || — || align=right | 6.7 km || 
|-id=509 bgcolor=#fefefe
| 115509 ||  || — || October 16, 2003 || Palomar || NEAT || CHL || align=right | 3.0 km || 
|-id=510 bgcolor=#E9E9E9
| 115510 ||  || — || October 16, 2003 || Palomar || NEAT || — || align=right | 4.7 km || 
|-id=511 bgcolor=#E9E9E9
| 115511 ||  || — || October 16, 2003 || Anderson Mesa || LONEOS || — || align=right | 3.1 km || 
|-id=512 bgcolor=#d6d6d6
| 115512 ||  || — || October 16, 2003 || Palomar || NEAT || — || align=right | 8.8 km || 
|-id=513 bgcolor=#d6d6d6
| 115513 ||  || — || October 16, 2003 || Palomar || NEAT || EOS || align=right | 3.8 km || 
|-id=514 bgcolor=#E9E9E9
| 115514 ||  || — || October 16, 2003 || Palomar || NEAT || — || align=right | 2.7 km || 
|-id=515 bgcolor=#E9E9E9
| 115515 ||  || — || October 16, 2003 || Palomar || NEAT || — || align=right | 2.3 km || 
|-id=516 bgcolor=#E9E9E9
| 115516 ||  || — || October 16, 2003 || Palomar || NEAT || EUN || align=right | 2.8 km || 
|-id=517 bgcolor=#d6d6d6
| 115517 ||  || — || October 16, 2003 || Črni Vrh || Črni Vrh || ITH || align=right | 4.8 km || 
|-id=518 bgcolor=#d6d6d6
| 115518 ||  || — || October 16, 2003 || Črni Vrh || Črni Vrh || EOS || align=right | 3.7 km || 
|-id=519 bgcolor=#d6d6d6
| 115519 ||  || — || October 16, 2003 || Črni Vrh || Črni Vrh || — || align=right | 4.2 km || 
|-id=520 bgcolor=#E9E9E9
| 115520 ||  || — || October 17, 2003 || Črni Vrh || Črni Vrh || — || align=right | 3.4 km || 
|-id=521 bgcolor=#fefefe
| 115521 ||  || — || October 17, 2003 || Kitt Peak || Spacewatch || V || align=right | 1.5 km || 
|-id=522 bgcolor=#fefefe
| 115522 ||  || — || October 16, 2003 || Kitt Peak || Spacewatch || NYS || align=right | 1.1 km || 
|-id=523 bgcolor=#fefefe
| 115523 ||  || — || October 16, 2003 || Anderson Mesa || LONEOS || — || align=right | 2.8 km || 
|-id=524 bgcolor=#E9E9E9
| 115524 ||  || — || October 21, 2003 || Goodricke-Pigott || R. A. Tucker || AER || align=right | 2.6 km || 
|-id=525 bgcolor=#E9E9E9
| 115525 ||  || — || October 16, 2003 || Goodricke-Pigott || R. A. Tucker || — || align=right | 2.5 km || 
|-id=526 bgcolor=#d6d6d6
| 115526 ||  || — || October 20, 2003 || Goodricke-Pigott || R. A. Tucker || EOS || align=right | 4.9 km || 
|-id=527 bgcolor=#fefefe
| 115527 ||  || — || October 16, 2003 || Anderson Mesa || LONEOS || V || align=right | 1.4 km || 
|-id=528 bgcolor=#d6d6d6
| 115528 ||  || — || October 16, 2003 || Anderson Mesa || LONEOS || — || align=right | 5.3 km || 
|-id=529 bgcolor=#E9E9E9
| 115529 ||  || — || October 16, 2003 || Anderson Mesa || LONEOS || — || align=right | 3.1 km || 
|-id=530 bgcolor=#E9E9E9
| 115530 ||  || — || October 16, 2003 || Anderson Mesa || LONEOS || — || align=right | 4.5 km || 
|-id=531 bgcolor=#E9E9E9
| 115531 ||  || — || October 18, 2003 || Palomar || NEAT || — || align=right | 5.1 km || 
|-id=532 bgcolor=#d6d6d6
| 115532 ||  || — || October 18, 2003 || Palomar || NEAT || — || align=right | 5.3 km || 
|-id=533 bgcolor=#d6d6d6
| 115533 ||  || — || October 18, 2003 || Palomar || NEAT || — || align=right | 4.6 km || 
|-id=534 bgcolor=#d6d6d6
| 115534 ||  || — || October 18, 2003 || Palomar || NEAT || EOS || align=right | 3.3 km || 
|-id=535 bgcolor=#d6d6d6
| 115535 ||  || — || October 18, 2003 || Palomar || NEAT || — || align=right | 7.6 km || 
|-id=536 bgcolor=#d6d6d6
| 115536 ||  || — || October 18, 2003 || Palomar || NEAT || EOS || align=right | 5.1 km || 
|-id=537 bgcolor=#d6d6d6
| 115537 ||  || — || October 23, 2003 || Kitt Peak || Spacewatch || — || align=right | 4.3 km || 
|-id=538 bgcolor=#E9E9E9
| 115538 ||  || — || October 16, 2003 || Kitt Peak || Spacewatch || — || align=right | 5.5 km || 
|-id=539 bgcolor=#fefefe
| 115539 ||  || — || October 16, 2003 || Palomar || NEAT || FLO || align=right | 1.4 km || 
|-id=540 bgcolor=#E9E9E9
| 115540 ||  || — || October 16, 2003 || Anderson Mesa || LONEOS || — || align=right | 4.7 km || 
|-id=541 bgcolor=#E9E9E9
| 115541 ||  || — || October 16, 2003 || Palomar || NEAT || — || align=right | 2.5 km || 
|-id=542 bgcolor=#d6d6d6
| 115542 ||  || — || October 16, 2003 || Anderson Mesa || LONEOS || — || align=right | 5.9 km || 
|-id=543 bgcolor=#E9E9E9
| 115543 ||  || — || October 16, 2003 || Anderson Mesa || LONEOS || — || align=right | 5.5 km || 
|-id=544 bgcolor=#E9E9E9
| 115544 ||  || — || October 16, 2003 || Anderson Mesa || LONEOS || EUN || align=right | 2.1 km || 
|-id=545 bgcolor=#E9E9E9
| 115545 ||  || — || October 16, 2003 || Anderson Mesa || LONEOS || AER || align=right | 2.4 km || 
|-id=546 bgcolor=#d6d6d6
| 115546 ||  || — || October 16, 2003 || Palomar || NEAT || EOS || align=right | 4.4 km || 
|-id=547 bgcolor=#d6d6d6
| 115547 ||  || — || October 16, 2003 || Palomar || NEAT || — || align=right | 6.6 km || 
|-id=548 bgcolor=#d6d6d6
| 115548 ||  || — || October 16, 2003 || Palomar || NEAT || — || align=right | 5.9 km || 
|-id=549 bgcolor=#d6d6d6
| 115549 ||  || — || October 16, 2003 || Palomar || NEAT || — || align=right | 8.3 km || 
|-id=550 bgcolor=#d6d6d6
| 115550 ||  || — || October 16, 2003 || Palomar || NEAT || EOS || align=right | 4.0 km || 
|-id=551 bgcolor=#d6d6d6
| 115551 ||  || — || October 18, 2003 || Kitt Peak || Spacewatch || KOR || align=right | 2.6 km || 
|-id=552 bgcolor=#d6d6d6
| 115552 ||  || — || October 18, 2003 || Kitt Peak || Spacewatch || KOR || align=right | 2.9 km || 
|-id=553 bgcolor=#fefefe
| 115553 ||  || — || October 19, 2003 || Kitt Peak || Spacewatch || — || align=right | 1.8 km || 
|-id=554 bgcolor=#d6d6d6
| 115554 ||  || — || October 16, 2003 || Črni Vrh || Črni Vrh || — || align=right | 5.6 km || 
|-id=555 bgcolor=#d6d6d6
| 115555 ||  || — || October 17, 2003 || Kitt Peak || Spacewatch || — || align=right | 6.8 km || 
|-id=556 bgcolor=#fefefe
| 115556 ||  || — || October 17, 2003 || Anderson Mesa || LONEOS || — || align=right | 1.7 km || 
|-id=557 bgcolor=#d6d6d6
| 115557 ||  || — || October 17, 2003 || Kitt Peak || Spacewatch || TEL || align=right | 2.7 km || 
|-id=558 bgcolor=#d6d6d6
| 115558 ||  || — || October 17, 2003 || Anderson Mesa || LONEOS || — || align=right | 6.0 km || 
|-id=559 bgcolor=#d6d6d6
| 115559 ||  || — || October 17, 2003 || Anderson Mesa || LONEOS || — || align=right | 5.3 km || 
|-id=560 bgcolor=#fefefe
| 115560 ||  || — || October 18, 2003 || Haleakala || NEAT || — || align=right | 1.4 km || 
|-id=561 bgcolor=#d6d6d6
| 115561 Frankherbert ||  ||  || October 20, 2003 || Needville || W. G. Dillon, D. Wells || — || align=right | 6.7 km || 
|-id=562 bgcolor=#d6d6d6
| 115562 ||  || — || October 16, 2003 || Kitt Peak || Spacewatch || — || align=right | 3.9 km || 
|-id=563 bgcolor=#E9E9E9
| 115563 ||  || — || October 16, 2003 || Anderson Mesa || LONEOS || — || align=right | 2.4 km || 
|-id=564 bgcolor=#d6d6d6
| 115564 ||  || — || October 16, 2003 || Anderson Mesa || LONEOS || — || align=right | 4.4 km || 
|-id=565 bgcolor=#d6d6d6
| 115565 ||  || — || October 16, 2003 || Haleakala || NEAT || HYG || align=right | 4.2 km || 
|-id=566 bgcolor=#fefefe
| 115566 ||  || — || October 18, 2003 || Haleakala || NEAT || — || align=right | 1.5 km || 
|-id=567 bgcolor=#fefefe
| 115567 ||  || — || October 19, 2003 || Palomar || NEAT || — || align=right | 1.6 km || 
|-id=568 bgcolor=#E9E9E9
| 115568 ||  || — || October 19, 2003 || Haleakala || NEAT || — || align=right | 4.7 km || 
|-id=569 bgcolor=#E9E9E9
| 115569 ||  || — || October 18, 2003 || Kitt Peak || Spacewatch || — || align=right | 2.6 km || 
|-id=570 bgcolor=#fefefe
| 115570 ||  || — || October 18, 2003 || Kitt Peak || Spacewatch || V || align=right data-sort-value="0.97" | 970 m || 
|-id=571 bgcolor=#d6d6d6
| 115571 ||  || — || October 18, 2003 || Haleakala || NEAT || — || align=right | 6.6 km || 
|-id=572 bgcolor=#fefefe
| 115572 ||  || — || October 18, 2003 || Palomar || NEAT || — || align=right | 1.8 km || 
|-id=573 bgcolor=#E9E9E9
| 115573 ||  || — || October 18, 2003 || Palomar || NEAT || WIT || align=right | 2.1 km || 
|-id=574 bgcolor=#E9E9E9
| 115574 ||  || — || October 18, 2003 || Palomar || NEAT || — || align=right | 2.2 km || 
|-id=575 bgcolor=#E9E9E9
| 115575 ||  || — || October 18, 2003 || Palomar || NEAT || — || align=right | 3.5 km || 
|-id=576 bgcolor=#d6d6d6
| 115576 ||  || — || October 19, 2003 || Anderson Mesa || LONEOS || — || align=right | 4.3 km || 
|-id=577 bgcolor=#d6d6d6
| 115577 ||  || — || October 19, 2003 || Anderson Mesa || LONEOS || — || align=right | 3.8 km || 
|-id=578 bgcolor=#E9E9E9
| 115578 ||  || — || October 19, 2003 || Anderson Mesa || LONEOS || HNS || align=right | 1.9 km || 
|-id=579 bgcolor=#E9E9E9
| 115579 ||  || — || October 20, 2003 || Socorro || LINEAR || WIT || align=right | 2.3 km || 
|-id=580 bgcolor=#E9E9E9
| 115580 ||  || — || October 20, 2003 || Socorro || LINEAR || NEM || align=right | 4.4 km || 
|-id=581 bgcolor=#fefefe
| 115581 ||  || — || October 20, 2003 || Socorro || LINEAR || — || align=right | 1.5 km || 
|-id=582 bgcolor=#d6d6d6
| 115582 ||  || — || October 20, 2003 || Palomar || NEAT || EOS || align=right | 3.9 km || 
|-id=583 bgcolor=#E9E9E9
| 115583 ||  || — || October 17, 2003 || Kitt Peak || Spacewatch || — || align=right | 4.8 km || 
|-id=584 bgcolor=#E9E9E9
| 115584 ||  || — || October 18, 2003 || Haleakala || NEAT || HNA || align=right | 5.6 km || 
|-id=585 bgcolor=#fefefe
| 115585 ||  || — || October 18, 2003 || Haleakala || NEAT || NYS || align=right | 1.3 km || 
|-id=586 bgcolor=#d6d6d6
| 115586 ||  || — || October 18, 2003 || Kitt Peak || Spacewatch || KOR || align=right | 2.7 km || 
|-id=587 bgcolor=#fefefe
| 115587 ||  || — || October 19, 2003 || Kitt Peak || Spacewatch || MAS || align=right | 1.2 km || 
|-id=588 bgcolor=#E9E9E9
| 115588 ||  || — || October 19, 2003 || Kitt Peak || Spacewatch || — || align=right | 1.7 km || 
|-id=589 bgcolor=#d6d6d6
| 115589 ||  || — || October 19, 2003 || Kitt Peak || Spacewatch || — || align=right | 2.7 km || 
|-id=590 bgcolor=#E9E9E9
| 115590 ||  || — || October 19, 2003 || Kitt Peak || Spacewatch || — || align=right | 2.7 km || 
|-id=591 bgcolor=#d6d6d6
| 115591 ||  || — || October 19, 2003 || Anderson Mesa || LONEOS || TEL || align=right | 2.8 km || 
|-id=592 bgcolor=#E9E9E9
| 115592 ||  || — || October 19, 2003 || Anderson Mesa || LONEOS || KON || align=right | 5.3 km || 
|-id=593 bgcolor=#d6d6d6
| 115593 ||  || — || October 19, 2003 || Anderson Mesa || LONEOS || — || align=right | 6.4 km || 
|-id=594 bgcolor=#d6d6d6
| 115594 ||  || — || October 19, 2003 || Anderson Mesa || LONEOS || — || align=right | 3.8 km || 
|-id=595 bgcolor=#E9E9E9
| 115595 ||  || — || October 19, 2003 || Anderson Mesa || LONEOS || — || align=right | 4.7 km || 
|-id=596 bgcolor=#d6d6d6
| 115596 ||  || — || October 19, 2003 || Anderson Mesa || LONEOS || — || align=right | 9.7 km || 
|-id=597 bgcolor=#d6d6d6
| 115597 ||  || — || October 19, 2003 || Anderson Mesa || LONEOS || — || align=right | 4.7 km || 
|-id=598 bgcolor=#d6d6d6
| 115598 ||  || — || October 19, 2003 || Anderson Mesa || LONEOS || EOS || align=right | 4.1 km || 
|-id=599 bgcolor=#E9E9E9
| 115599 ||  || — || October 19, 2003 || Anderson Mesa || LONEOS || — || align=right | 2.8 km || 
|-id=600 bgcolor=#E9E9E9
| 115600 ||  || — || October 19, 2003 || Kitt Peak || Spacewatch || MAR || align=right | 1.7 km || 
|}

115601–115700 

|-bgcolor=#fefefe
| 115601 ||  || — || October 19, 2003 || Palomar || NEAT || — || align=right | 1.3 km || 
|-id=602 bgcolor=#E9E9E9
| 115602 ||  || — || October 19, 2003 || Palomar || NEAT || — || align=right | 2.2 km || 
|-id=603 bgcolor=#fefefe
| 115603 ||  || — || October 19, 2003 || Palomar || NEAT || — || align=right | 2.7 km || 
|-id=604 bgcolor=#d6d6d6
| 115604 ||  || — || October 19, 2003 || Palomar || NEAT || HYG || align=right | 6.0 km || 
|-id=605 bgcolor=#d6d6d6
| 115605 ||  || — || October 19, 2003 || Palomar || NEAT || — || align=right | 7.9 km || 
|-id=606 bgcolor=#fefefe
| 115606 ||  || — || October 20, 2003 || Palomar || NEAT || — || align=right | 2.7 km || 
|-id=607 bgcolor=#d6d6d6
| 115607 ||  || — || October 20, 2003 || Socorro || LINEAR || — || align=right | 4.5 km || 
|-id=608 bgcolor=#d6d6d6
| 115608 ||  || — || October 20, 2003 || Kitt Peak || Spacewatch || KOR || align=right | 2.9 km || 
|-id=609 bgcolor=#E9E9E9
| 115609 ||  || — || October 20, 2003 || Kitt Peak || Spacewatch || — || align=right | 2.5 km || 
|-id=610 bgcolor=#fefefe
| 115610 ||  || — || October 20, 2003 || Kitt Peak || Spacewatch || V || align=right | 1.4 km || 
|-id=611 bgcolor=#E9E9E9
| 115611 ||  || — || October 20, 2003 || Kitt Peak || Spacewatch || — || align=right | 3.0 km || 
|-id=612 bgcolor=#fefefe
| 115612 ||  || — || October 20, 2003 || Kitt Peak || Spacewatch || NYS || align=right | 1.4 km || 
|-id=613 bgcolor=#d6d6d6
| 115613 ||  || — || October 19, 2003 || Kitt Peak || Spacewatch || — || align=right | 3.7 km || 
|-id=614 bgcolor=#fefefe
| 115614 ||  || — || October 20, 2003 || Socorro || LINEAR || — || align=right | 2.2 km || 
|-id=615 bgcolor=#E9E9E9
| 115615 ||  || — || October 20, 2003 || Socorro || LINEAR || — || align=right | 3.5 km || 
|-id=616 bgcolor=#d6d6d6
| 115616 ||  || — || October 20, 2003 || Socorro || LINEAR || — || align=right | 3.8 km || 
|-id=617 bgcolor=#E9E9E9
| 115617 ||  || — || October 20, 2003 || Socorro || LINEAR || INO || align=right | 2.8 km || 
|-id=618 bgcolor=#E9E9E9
| 115618 ||  || — || October 20, 2003 || Socorro || LINEAR || RAF || align=right | 2.6 km || 
|-id=619 bgcolor=#d6d6d6
| 115619 ||  || — || October 20, 2003 || Kitt Peak || Spacewatch || — || align=right | 4.5 km || 
|-id=620 bgcolor=#d6d6d6
| 115620 ||  || — || October 20, 2003 || Palomar || NEAT || HYG || align=right | 6.6 km || 
|-id=621 bgcolor=#E9E9E9
| 115621 ||  || — || October 21, 2003 || Socorro || LINEAR || — || align=right | 5.4 km || 
|-id=622 bgcolor=#d6d6d6
| 115622 ||  || — || October 21, 2003 || Socorro || LINEAR || HYG || align=right | 5.2 km || 
|-id=623 bgcolor=#fefefe
| 115623 ||  || — || October 17, 2003 || Anderson Mesa || LONEOS || V || align=right | 1.5 km || 
|-id=624 bgcolor=#d6d6d6
| 115624 ||  || — || October 18, 2003 || Palomar || NEAT || — || align=right | 8.9 km || 
|-id=625 bgcolor=#d6d6d6
| 115625 ||  || — || October 19, 2003 || Socorro || LINEAR || — || align=right | 7.3 km || 
|-id=626 bgcolor=#E9E9E9
| 115626 ||  || — || October 19, 2003 || Socorro || LINEAR || MAR || align=right | 2.6 km || 
|-id=627 bgcolor=#E9E9E9
| 115627 ||  || — || October 19, 2003 || Socorro || LINEAR || — || align=right | 3.4 km || 
|-id=628 bgcolor=#E9E9E9
| 115628 ||  || — || October 19, 2003 || Socorro || LINEAR || — || align=right | 3.5 km || 
|-id=629 bgcolor=#E9E9E9
| 115629 ||  || — || October 19, 2003 || Socorro || LINEAR || — || align=right | 3.2 km || 
|-id=630 bgcolor=#d6d6d6
| 115630 ||  || — || October 19, 2003 || Socorro || LINEAR || TIR || align=right | 6.7 km || 
|-id=631 bgcolor=#fefefe
| 115631 ||  || — || October 19, 2003 || Kitt Peak || Spacewatch || — || align=right | 1.4 km || 
|-id=632 bgcolor=#d6d6d6
| 115632 ||  || — || October 20, 2003 || Socorro || LINEAR || KOR || align=right | 2.8 km || 
|-id=633 bgcolor=#d6d6d6
| 115633 ||  || — || October 20, 2003 || Socorro || LINEAR || — || align=right | 5.7 km || 
|-id=634 bgcolor=#E9E9E9
| 115634 ||  || — || October 20, 2003 || Socorro || LINEAR || — || align=right | 4.4 km || 
|-id=635 bgcolor=#E9E9E9
| 115635 ||  || — || October 20, 2003 || Socorro || LINEAR || — || align=right | 3.0 km || 
|-id=636 bgcolor=#E9E9E9
| 115636 ||  || — || October 20, 2003 || Socorro || LINEAR || EUN || align=right | 2.0 km || 
|-id=637 bgcolor=#E9E9E9
| 115637 ||  || — || October 20, 2003 || Socorro || LINEAR || — || align=right | 5.5 km || 
|-id=638 bgcolor=#d6d6d6
| 115638 ||  || — || October 20, 2003 || Palomar || NEAT || — || align=right | 5.8 km || 
|-id=639 bgcolor=#E9E9E9
| 115639 ||  || — || October 18, 2003 || Palomar || NEAT || — || align=right | 2.7 km || 
|-id=640 bgcolor=#E9E9E9
| 115640 ||  || — || October 18, 2003 || Palomar || NEAT || GEF || align=right | 2.3 km || 
|-id=641 bgcolor=#d6d6d6
| 115641 ||  || — || October 19, 2003 || Anderson Mesa || LONEOS || MEL || align=right | 5.9 km || 
|-id=642 bgcolor=#E9E9E9
| 115642 ||  || — || October 19, 2003 || Anderson Mesa || LONEOS || WIT || align=right | 3.0 km || 
|-id=643 bgcolor=#E9E9E9
| 115643 ||  || — || October 19, 2003 || Palomar || NEAT || — || align=right | 4.9 km || 
|-id=644 bgcolor=#E9E9E9
| 115644 ||  || — || October 19, 2003 || Palomar || NEAT || GEF || align=right | 2.6 km || 
|-id=645 bgcolor=#d6d6d6
| 115645 ||  || — || October 19, 2003 || Palomar || NEAT || — || align=right | 3.3 km || 
|-id=646 bgcolor=#E9E9E9
| 115646 ||  || — || October 19, 2003 || Palomar || NEAT || — || align=right | 4.0 km || 
|-id=647 bgcolor=#E9E9E9
| 115647 ||  || — || October 20, 2003 || Palomar || NEAT || — || align=right | 5.1 km || 
|-id=648 bgcolor=#fefefe
| 115648 ||  || — || October 20, 2003 || Palomar || NEAT || — || align=right | 3.0 km || 
|-id=649 bgcolor=#E9E9E9
| 115649 ||  || — || October 21, 2003 || Palomar || NEAT || GAL || align=right | 3.4 km || 
|-id=650 bgcolor=#fefefe
| 115650 ||  || — || October 21, 2003 || Palomar || NEAT || V || align=right | 1.3 km || 
|-id=651 bgcolor=#E9E9E9
| 115651 ||  || — || October 21, 2003 || Socorro || LINEAR || AGN || align=right | 2.4 km || 
|-id=652 bgcolor=#fefefe
| 115652 ||  || — || October 21, 2003 || Palomar || NEAT || — || align=right | 1.5 km || 
|-id=653 bgcolor=#fefefe
| 115653 ||  || — || October 21, 2003 || Socorro || LINEAR || MAS || align=right | 1.3 km || 
|-id=654 bgcolor=#fefefe
| 115654 ||  || — || October 21, 2003 || Socorro || LINEAR || — || align=right | 1.9 km || 
|-id=655 bgcolor=#d6d6d6
| 115655 ||  || — || October 21, 2003 || Socorro || LINEAR || — || align=right | 5.2 km || 
|-id=656 bgcolor=#d6d6d6
| 115656 ||  || — || October 21, 2003 || Socorro || LINEAR || — || align=right | 8.9 km || 
|-id=657 bgcolor=#d6d6d6
| 115657 ||  || — || October 21, 2003 || Socorro || LINEAR || — || align=right | 11 km || 
|-id=658 bgcolor=#d6d6d6
| 115658 ||  || — || October 16, 2003 || Palomar || NEAT || — || align=right | 4.3 km || 
|-id=659 bgcolor=#d6d6d6
| 115659 ||  || — || October 16, 2003 || Anderson Mesa || LONEOS || — || align=right | 8.4 km || 
|-id=660 bgcolor=#E9E9E9
| 115660 ||  || — || October 16, 2003 || Anderson Mesa || LONEOS || HOF || align=right | 5.2 km || 
|-id=661 bgcolor=#E9E9E9
| 115661 ||  || — || October 16, 2003 || Anderson Mesa || LONEOS || — || align=right | 4.2 km || 
|-id=662 bgcolor=#d6d6d6
| 115662 ||  || — || October 17, 2003 || Socorro || LINEAR || — || align=right | 4.6 km || 
|-id=663 bgcolor=#E9E9E9
| 115663 ||  || — || October 18, 2003 || Anderson Mesa || LONEOS || — || align=right | 4.6 km || 
|-id=664 bgcolor=#d6d6d6
| 115664 ||  || — || October 18, 2003 || Anderson Mesa || LONEOS || — || align=right | 6.5 km || 
|-id=665 bgcolor=#d6d6d6
| 115665 ||  || — || October 18, 2003 || Anderson Mesa || LONEOS || — || align=right | 6.2 km || 
|-id=666 bgcolor=#fefefe
| 115666 ||  || — || October 18, 2003 || Anderson Mesa || LONEOS || — || align=right | 1.6 km || 
|-id=667 bgcolor=#E9E9E9
| 115667 ||  || — || October 18, 2003 || Anderson Mesa || LONEOS || — || align=right | 3.0 km || 
|-id=668 bgcolor=#E9E9E9
| 115668 ||  || — || October 18, 2003 || Anderson Mesa || LONEOS || — || align=right | 4.5 km || 
|-id=669 bgcolor=#E9E9E9
| 115669 ||  || — || October 18, 2003 || Anderson Mesa || LONEOS || — || align=right | 3.9 km || 
|-id=670 bgcolor=#d6d6d6
| 115670 ||  || — || October 18, 2003 || Anderson Mesa || LONEOS || — || align=right | 3.9 km || 
|-id=671 bgcolor=#d6d6d6
| 115671 ||  || — || October 18, 2003 || Anderson Mesa || LONEOS || EOS || align=right | 6.1 km || 
|-id=672 bgcolor=#d6d6d6
| 115672 ||  || — || October 18, 2003 || Anderson Mesa || LONEOS || — || align=right | 6.6 km || 
|-id=673 bgcolor=#d6d6d6
| 115673 ||  || — || October 18, 2003 || Anderson Mesa || LONEOS || — || align=right | 3.2 km || 
|-id=674 bgcolor=#E9E9E9
| 115674 ||  || — || October 18, 2003 || Anderson Mesa || LONEOS || EUN || align=right | 2.5 km || 
|-id=675 bgcolor=#E9E9E9
| 115675 ||  || — || October 18, 2003 || Anderson Mesa || LONEOS || GEF || align=right | 2.5 km || 
|-id=676 bgcolor=#d6d6d6
| 115676 ||  || — || October 18, 2003 || Anderson Mesa || LONEOS || HYG || align=right | 6.1 km || 
|-id=677 bgcolor=#E9E9E9
| 115677 ||  || — || October 18, 2003 || Anderson Mesa || LONEOS || EUN || align=right | 2.8 km || 
|-id=678 bgcolor=#d6d6d6
| 115678 ||  || — || October 19, 2003 || Kitt Peak || Spacewatch || — || align=right | 5.2 km || 
|-id=679 bgcolor=#d6d6d6
| 115679 ||  || — || October 19, 2003 || Anderson Mesa || LONEOS || URS || align=right | 6.9 km || 
|-id=680 bgcolor=#fefefe
| 115680 ||  || — || October 19, 2003 || Palomar || NEAT || — || align=right | 2.0 km || 
|-id=681 bgcolor=#d6d6d6
| 115681 ||  || — || October 20, 2003 || Socorro || LINEAR || KOR || align=right | 3.0 km || 
|-id=682 bgcolor=#E9E9E9
| 115682 ||  || — || October 20, 2003 || Kitt Peak || Spacewatch || — || align=right | 2.2 km || 
|-id=683 bgcolor=#d6d6d6
| 115683 ||  || — || October 20, 2003 || Kitt Peak || Spacewatch || — || align=right | 6.3 km || 
|-id=684 bgcolor=#d6d6d6
| 115684 ||  || — || October 20, 2003 || Kitt Peak || Spacewatch || — || align=right | 6.3 km || 
|-id=685 bgcolor=#d6d6d6
| 115685 ||  || — || October 21, 2003 || Anderson Mesa || LONEOS || — || align=right | 4.6 km || 
|-id=686 bgcolor=#fefefe
| 115686 ||  || — || October 21, 2003 || Kitt Peak || Spacewatch || — || align=right | 2.6 km || 
|-id=687 bgcolor=#d6d6d6
| 115687 ||  || — || October 21, 2003 || Palomar || NEAT || KOR || align=right | 2.3 km || 
|-id=688 bgcolor=#d6d6d6
| 115688 ||  || — || October 21, 2003 || Palomar || NEAT || — || align=right | 3.1 km || 
|-id=689 bgcolor=#E9E9E9
| 115689 ||  || — || October 21, 2003 || Palomar || NEAT || ADE || align=right | 3.1 km || 
|-id=690 bgcolor=#d6d6d6
| 115690 ||  || — || October 20, 2003 || Palomar || NEAT || VER || align=right | 5.3 km || 
|-id=691 bgcolor=#fefefe
| 115691 ||  || — || October 20, 2003 || Socorro || LINEAR || FLO || align=right | 1.3 km || 
|-id=692 bgcolor=#E9E9E9
| 115692 ||  || — || October 20, 2003 || Socorro || LINEAR || — || align=right | 4.4 km || 
|-id=693 bgcolor=#d6d6d6
| 115693 ||  || — || October 20, 2003 || Socorro || LINEAR || — || align=right | 5.4 km || 
|-id=694 bgcolor=#d6d6d6
| 115694 ||  || — || October 20, 2003 || Kitt Peak || Spacewatch || — || align=right | 5.7 km || 
|-id=695 bgcolor=#E9E9E9
| 115695 ||  || — || October 21, 2003 || Kitt Peak || Spacewatch || — || align=right | 3.2 km || 
|-id=696 bgcolor=#E9E9E9
| 115696 ||  || — || October 21, 2003 || Socorro || LINEAR || — || align=right | 4.5 km || 
|-id=697 bgcolor=#fefefe
| 115697 ||  || — || October 21, 2003 || Socorro || LINEAR || V || align=right | 1.5 km || 
|-id=698 bgcolor=#fefefe
| 115698 ||  || — || October 21, 2003 || Socorro || LINEAR || — || align=right | 1.8 km || 
|-id=699 bgcolor=#d6d6d6
| 115699 ||  || — || October 21, 2003 || Socorro || LINEAR || — || align=right | 7.9 km || 
|-id=700 bgcolor=#d6d6d6
| 115700 ||  || — || October 21, 2003 || Socorro || LINEAR || SYL7:4 || align=right | 12 km || 
|}

115701–115800 

|-bgcolor=#d6d6d6
| 115701 ||  || — || October 21, 2003 || Socorro || LINEAR || HYG || align=right | 6.7 km || 
|-id=702 bgcolor=#E9E9E9
| 115702 ||  || — || October 21, 2003 || Socorro || LINEAR || AGN || align=right | 2.6 km || 
|-id=703 bgcolor=#d6d6d6
| 115703 ||  || — || October 21, 2003 || Palomar || NEAT || — || align=right | 4.1 km || 
|-id=704 bgcolor=#d6d6d6
| 115704 ||  || — || October 21, 2003 || Kitt Peak || Spacewatch || KOR || align=right | 3.1 km || 
|-id=705 bgcolor=#E9E9E9
| 115705 ||  || — || October 21, 2003 || Kvistaberg || UDAS || PAD || align=right | 4.2 km || 
|-id=706 bgcolor=#d6d6d6
| 115706 ||  || — || October 22, 2003 || Socorro || LINEAR || — || align=right | 4.3 km || 
|-id=707 bgcolor=#d6d6d6
| 115707 ||  || — || October 22, 2003 || Socorro || LINEAR || THM || align=right | 5.4 km || 
|-id=708 bgcolor=#E9E9E9
| 115708 ||  || — || October 22, 2003 || Socorro || LINEAR || PAD || align=right | 5.3 km || 
|-id=709 bgcolor=#E9E9E9
| 115709 ||  || — || October 22, 2003 || Haleakala || NEAT || — || align=right | 2.8 km || 
|-id=710 bgcolor=#E9E9E9
| 115710 ||  || — || October 22, 2003 || Kitt Peak || Spacewatch || — || align=right | 2.9 km || 
|-id=711 bgcolor=#E9E9E9
| 115711 ||  || — || October 22, 2003 || Kitt Peak || Spacewatch || — || align=right | 4.7 km || 
|-id=712 bgcolor=#d6d6d6
| 115712 ||  || — || October 20, 2003 || Socorro || LINEAR || — || align=right | 2.7 km || 
|-id=713 bgcolor=#d6d6d6
| 115713 ||  || — || October 20, 2003 || Palomar || NEAT || — || align=right | 3.6 km || 
|-id=714 bgcolor=#d6d6d6
| 115714 ||  || — || October 20, 2003 || Kitt Peak || Spacewatch || — || align=right | 6.6 km || 
|-id=715 bgcolor=#d6d6d6
| 115715 ||  || — || October 20, 2003 || Palomar || NEAT || — || align=right | 6.4 km || 
|-id=716 bgcolor=#d6d6d6
| 115716 ||  || — || October 20, 2003 || Palomar || NEAT || — || align=right | 8.1 km || 
|-id=717 bgcolor=#fefefe
| 115717 ||  || — || October 21, 2003 || Kitt Peak || Spacewatch || MAS || align=right | 1.4 km || 
|-id=718 bgcolor=#d6d6d6
| 115718 ||  || — || October 21, 2003 || Anderson Mesa || LONEOS || — || align=right | 4.0 km || 
|-id=719 bgcolor=#fefefe
| 115719 ||  || — || October 21, 2003 || Palomar || NEAT || — || align=right | 1.4 km || 
|-id=720 bgcolor=#E9E9E9
| 115720 ||  || — || October 21, 2003 || Anderson Mesa || LONEOS || — || align=right | 1.7 km || 
|-id=721 bgcolor=#d6d6d6
| 115721 ||  || — || October 21, 2003 || Anderson Mesa || LONEOS || — || align=right | 3.7 km || 
|-id=722 bgcolor=#E9E9E9
| 115722 ||  || — || October 21, 2003 || Palomar || NEAT || — || align=right | 3.6 km || 
|-id=723 bgcolor=#fefefe
| 115723 ||  || — || October 21, 2003 || Socorro || LINEAR || — || align=right | 1.8 km || 
|-id=724 bgcolor=#d6d6d6
| 115724 ||  || — || October 21, 2003 || Socorro || LINEAR || HYG || align=right | 5.0 km || 
|-id=725 bgcolor=#d6d6d6
| 115725 ||  || — || October 21, 2003 || Socorro || LINEAR || EOS || align=right | 3.4 km || 
|-id=726 bgcolor=#d6d6d6
| 115726 ||  || — || October 21, 2003 || Socorro || LINEAR || — || align=right | 5.8 km || 
|-id=727 bgcolor=#d6d6d6
| 115727 ||  || — || October 21, 2003 || Palomar || NEAT || KOR || align=right | 2.2 km || 
|-id=728 bgcolor=#E9E9E9
| 115728 ||  || — || October 21, 2003 || Palomar || NEAT || — || align=right | 3.2 km || 
|-id=729 bgcolor=#E9E9E9
| 115729 ||  || — || October 21, 2003 || Palomar || NEAT || AST || align=right | 4.8 km || 
|-id=730 bgcolor=#d6d6d6
| 115730 ||  || — || October 21, 2003 || Palomar || NEAT || EOS || align=right | 4.1 km || 
|-id=731 bgcolor=#fefefe
| 115731 ||  || — || October 21, 2003 || Palomar || NEAT || EUT || align=right | 1.1 km || 
|-id=732 bgcolor=#E9E9E9
| 115732 ||  || — || October 21, 2003 || Kitt Peak || Spacewatch || — || align=right | 3.1 km || 
|-id=733 bgcolor=#d6d6d6
| 115733 ||  || — || October 21, 2003 || Kitt Peak || Spacewatch || KOR || align=right | 3.0 km || 
|-id=734 bgcolor=#E9E9E9
| 115734 ||  || — || October 22, 2003 || Socorro || LINEAR || — || align=right | 5.4 km || 
|-id=735 bgcolor=#E9E9E9
| 115735 ||  || — || October 22, 2003 || Socorro || LINEAR || — || align=right | 4.6 km || 
|-id=736 bgcolor=#d6d6d6
| 115736 ||  || — || October 22, 2003 || Palomar || NEAT || — || align=right | 5.6 km || 
|-id=737 bgcolor=#d6d6d6
| 115737 ||  || — || October 22, 2003 || Socorro || LINEAR || — || align=right | 5.3 km || 
|-id=738 bgcolor=#fefefe
| 115738 ||  || — || October 22, 2003 || Socorro || LINEAR || — || align=right | 1.4 km || 
|-id=739 bgcolor=#fefefe
| 115739 ||  || — || October 22, 2003 || Socorro || LINEAR || — || align=right | 1.4 km || 
|-id=740 bgcolor=#E9E9E9
| 115740 ||  || — || October 22, 2003 || Kitt Peak || Spacewatch || — || align=right | 5.4 km || 
|-id=741 bgcolor=#E9E9E9
| 115741 ||  || — || October 22, 2003 || Kitt Peak || Spacewatch || HOF || align=right | 5.9 km || 
|-id=742 bgcolor=#d6d6d6
| 115742 ||  || — || October 22, 2003 || Haleakala || NEAT || — || align=right | 3.6 km || 
|-id=743 bgcolor=#d6d6d6
| 115743 ||  || — || October 22, 2003 || Haleakala || NEAT || THM || align=right | 5.6 km || 
|-id=744 bgcolor=#E9E9E9
| 115744 ||  || — || October 20, 2003 || Palomar || NEAT || — || align=right | 1.7 km || 
|-id=745 bgcolor=#d6d6d6
| 115745 ||  || — || October 20, 2003 || Kitt Peak || Spacewatch || — || align=right | 4.1 km || 
|-id=746 bgcolor=#d6d6d6
| 115746 ||  || — || October 20, 2003 || Kitt Peak || Spacewatch || — || align=right | 7.5 km || 
|-id=747 bgcolor=#E9E9E9
| 115747 ||  || — || October 20, 2003 || Kitt Peak || Spacewatch || — || align=right | 2.9 km || 
|-id=748 bgcolor=#d6d6d6
| 115748 ||  || — || October 20, 2003 || Kitt Peak || Spacewatch || KOR || align=right | 2.3 km || 
|-id=749 bgcolor=#d6d6d6
| 115749 ||  || — || October 21, 2003 || Kitt Peak || Spacewatch || — || align=right | 2.8 km || 
|-id=750 bgcolor=#d6d6d6
| 115750 ||  || — || October 21, 2003 || Anderson Mesa || LONEOS || — || align=right | 7.7 km || 
|-id=751 bgcolor=#E9E9E9
| 115751 ||  || — || October 21, 2003 || Socorro || LINEAR || — || align=right | 3.5 km || 
|-id=752 bgcolor=#d6d6d6
| 115752 ||  || — || October 21, 2003 || Socorro || LINEAR || — || align=right | 8.6 km || 
|-id=753 bgcolor=#d6d6d6
| 115753 ||  || — || October 21, 2003 || Socorro || LINEAR || — || align=right | 6.0 km || 
|-id=754 bgcolor=#d6d6d6
| 115754 ||  || — || October 21, 2003 || Kitt Peak || Spacewatch || — || align=right | 5.4 km || 
|-id=755 bgcolor=#d6d6d6
| 115755 ||  || — || October 21, 2003 || Socorro || LINEAR || EUP || align=right | 11 km || 
|-id=756 bgcolor=#E9E9E9
| 115756 ||  || — || October 22, 2003 || Socorro || LINEAR || AGN || align=right | 2.4 km || 
|-id=757 bgcolor=#d6d6d6
| 115757 ||  || — || October 22, 2003 || Socorro || LINEAR || — || align=right | 5.9 km || 
|-id=758 bgcolor=#fefefe
| 115758 ||  || — || October 22, 2003 || Socorro || LINEAR || V || align=right | 1.4 km || 
|-id=759 bgcolor=#E9E9E9
| 115759 ||  || — || October 22, 2003 || Socorro || LINEAR || — || align=right | 2.8 km || 
|-id=760 bgcolor=#E9E9E9
| 115760 ||  || — || October 22, 2003 || Socorro || LINEAR || — || align=right | 2.1 km || 
|-id=761 bgcolor=#d6d6d6
| 115761 ||  || — || October 22, 2003 || Socorro || LINEAR || — || align=right | 5.4 km || 
|-id=762 bgcolor=#E9E9E9
| 115762 ||  || — || October 22, 2003 || Socorro || LINEAR || — || align=right | 4.5 km || 
|-id=763 bgcolor=#fefefe
| 115763 ||  || — || October 22, 2003 || Socorro || LINEAR || V || align=right | 1.3 km || 
|-id=764 bgcolor=#fefefe
| 115764 ||  || — || October 22, 2003 || Socorro || LINEAR || V || align=right | 1.3 km || 
|-id=765 bgcolor=#E9E9E9
| 115765 ||  || — || October 22, 2003 || Socorro || LINEAR || JUN || align=right | 1.6 km || 
|-id=766 bgcolor=#d6d6d6
| 115766 ||  || — || October 22, 2003 || Socorro || LINEAR || — || align=right | 5.6 km || 
|-id=767 bgcolor=#E9E9E9
| 115767 ||  || — || October 22, 2003 || Socorro || LINEAR || — || align=right | 5.7 km || 
|-id=768 bgcolor=#d6d6d6
| 115768 ||  || — || October 22, 2003 || Socorro || LINEAR || — || align=right | 4.9 km || 
|-id=769 bgcolor=#E9E9E9
| 115769 ||  || — || October 22, 2003 || Kitt Peak || Spacewatch || — || align=right | 4.8 km || 
|-id=770 bgcolor=#fefefe
| 115770 ||  || — || October 22, 2003 || Kitt Peak || Spacewatch || — || align=right | 1.5 km || 
|-id=771 bgcolor=#d6d6d6
| 115771 ||  || — || October 22, 2003 || Socorro || LINEAR || — || align=right | 4.4 km || 
|-id=772 bgcolor=#fefefe
| 115772 ||  || — || October 23, 2003 || Kitt Peak || Spacewatch || — || align=right | 1.5 km || 
|-id=773 bgcolor=#E9E9E9
| 115773 ||  || — || October 23, 2003 || Anderson Mesa || LONEOS || — || align=right | 4.7 km || 
|-id=774 bgcolor=#E9E9E9
| 115774 ||  || — || October 23, 2003 || Anderson Mesa || LONEOS || — || align=right | 3.5 km || 
|-id=775 bgcolor=#d6d6d6
| 115775 ||  || — || October 23, 2003 || Nogales || Tenagra II Obs. || — || align=right | 9.8 km || 
|-id=776 bgcolor=#E9E9E9
| 115776 ||  || — || October 23, 2003 || Kitt Peak || Spacewatch || — || align=right | 4.2 km || 
|-id=777 bgcolor=#fefefe
| 115777 ||  || — || October 23, 2003 || Haleakala || NEAT || MAS || align=right | 1.3 km || 
|-id=778 bgcolor=#E9E9E9
| 115778 ||  || — || October 21, 2003 || Kitt Peak || Spacewatch || — || align=right | 3.1 km || 
|-id=779 bgcolor=#fefefe
| 115779 ||  || — || October 21, 2003 || Socorro || LINEAR || FLO || align=right | 1.3 km || 
|-id=780 bgcolor=#fefefe
| 115780 ||  || — || October 21, 2003 || Socorro || LINEAR || — || align=right | 1.3 km || 
|-id=781 bgcolor=#E9E9E9
| 115781 ||  || — || October 21, 2003 || Socorro || LINEAR || — || align=right | 2.7 km || 
|-id=782 bgcolor=#fefefe
| 115782 ||  || — || October 21, 2003 || Socorro || LINEAR || — || align=right | 4.0 km || 
|-id=783 bgcolor=#E9E9E9
| 115783 ||  || — || October 21, 2003 || Socorro || LINEAR || HEN || align=right | 2.2 km || 
|-id=784 bgcolor=#E9E9E9
| 115784 ||  || — || October 21, 2003 || Socorro || LINEAR || — || align=right | 3.3 km || 
|-id=785 bgcolor=#d6d6d6
| 115785 ||  || — || October 21, 2003 || Socorro || LINEAR || — || align=right | 5.0 km || 
|-id=786 bgcolor=#E9E9E9
| 115786 ||  || — || October 21, 2003 || Socorro || LINEAR || — || align=right | 6.0 km || 
|-id=787 bgcolor=#fefefe
| 115787 ||  || — || October 21, 2003 || Kitt Peak || Spacewatch || FLO || align=right | 1.4 km || 
|-id=788 bgcolor=#d6d6d6
| 115788 ||  || — || October 21, 2003 || Socorro || LINEAR || Tj (2.97) || align=right | 13 km || 
|-id=789 bgcolor=#E9E9E9
| 115789 ||  || — || October 22, 2003 || Socorro || LINEAR || — || align=right | 3.6 km || 
|-id=790 bgcolor=#fefefe
| 115790 ||  || — || October 22, 2003 || Socorro || LINEAR || — || align=right | 1.7 km || 
|-id=791 bgcolor=#d6d6d6
| 115791 ||  || — || October 22, 2003 || Socorro || LINEAR || URS || align=right | 8.6 km || 
|-id=792 bgcolor=#fefefe
| 115792 ||  || — || October 22, 2003 || Socorro || LINEAR || V || align=right | 1.6 km || 
|-id=793 bgcolor=#E9E9E9
| 115793 ||  || — || October 22, 2003 || Socorro || LINEAR || EUN || align=right | 3.4 km || 
|-id=794 bgcolor=#E9E9E9
| 115794 ||  || — || October 23, 2003 || Kitt Peak || Spacewatch || HOF || align=right | 3.8 km || 
|-id=795 bgcolor=#E9E9E9
| 115795 ||  || — || October 23, 2003 || Kitt Peak || Spacewatch || — || align=right | 5.7 km || 
|-id=796 bgcolor=#fefefe
| 115796 ||  || — || October 23, 2003 || Kitt Peak || Spacewatch || — || align=right | 1.5 km || 
|-id=797 bgcolor=#d6d6d6
| 115797 ||  || — || October 23, 2003 || Kitt Peak || Spacewatch || — || align=right | 5.7 km || 
|-id=798 bgcolor=#d6d6d6
| 115798 ||  || — || October 23, 2003 || Kitt Peak || Spacewatch || — || align=right | 5.4 km || 
|-id=799 bgcolor=#fefefe
| 115799 ||  || — || October 24, 2003 || Socorro || LINEAR || — || align=right | 1.5 km || 
|-id=800 bgcolor=#d6d6d6
| 115800 ||  || — || October 24, 2003 || Kitt Peak || Spacewatch || HYG || align=right | 5.7 km || 
|}

115801–115900 

|-bgcolor=#fefefe
| 115801 Punahou ||  ||  || October 23, 2003 || Junk Bond || D. Healy || MAS || align=right data-sort-value="0.90" | 900 m || 
|-id=802 bgcolor=#E9E9E9
| 115802 ||  || — || October 23, 2003 || Kitt Peak || Spacewatch || — || align=right | 2.3 km || 
|-id=803 bgcolor=#fefefe
| 115803 ||  || — || October 23, 2003 || Haleakala || NEAT || — || align=right | 1.9 km || 
|-id=804 bgcolor=#d6d6d6
| 115804 ||  || — || October 23, 2003 || Haleakala || NEAT || — || align=right | 4.6 km || 
|-id=805 bgcolor=#E9E9E9
| 115805 ||  || — || October 23, 2003 || Haleakala || NEAT || — || align=right | 2.5 km || 
|-id=806 bgcolor=#d6d6d6
| 115806 ||  || — || October 23, 2003 || Haleakala || NEAT || — || align=right | 7.1 km || 
|-id=807 bgcolor=#E9E9E9
| 115807 ||  || — || October 23, 2003 || Haleakala || NEAT || — || align=right | 2.6 km || 
|-id=808 bgcolor=#d6d6d6
| 115808 ||  || — || October 23, 2003 || Haleakala || NEAT || 7:4 || align=right | 10 km || 
|-id=809 bgcolor=#E9E9E9
| 115809 ||  || — || October 24, 2003 || Socorro || LINEAR || HOF || align=right | 6.0 km || 
|-id=810 bgcolor=#fefefe
| 115810 ||  || — || October 24, 2003 || Socorro || LINEAR || ERI || align=right | 3.3 km || 
|-id=811 bgcolor=#d6d6d6
| 115811 ||  || — || October 24, 2003 || Socorro || LINEAR || KOR || align=right | 2.4 km || 
|-id=812 bgcolor=#E9E9E9
| 115812 ||  || — || October 24, 2003 || Socorro || LINEAR || — || align=right | 3.9 km || 
|-id=813 bgcolor=#d6d6d6
| 115813 ||  || — || October 24, 2003 || Socorro || LINEAR || — || align=right | 3.6 km || 
|-id=814 bgcolor=#E9E9E9
| 115814 ||  || — || October 24, 2003 || Socorro || LINEAR || — || align=right | 3.2 km || 
|-id=815 bgcolor=#d6d6d6
| 115815 ||  || — || October 24, 2003 || Socorro || LINEAR || — || align=right | 6.0 km || 
|-id=816 bgcolor=#d6d6d6
| 115816 ||  || — || October 24, 2003 || Socorro || LINEAR || — || align=right | 7.2 km || 
|-id=817 bgcolor=#fefefe
| 115817 ||  || — || October 24, 2003 || Socorro || LINEAR || — || align=right | 1.1 km || 
|-id=818 bgcolor=#d6d6d6
| 115818 ||  || — || October 24, 2003 || Socorro || LINEAR || — || align=right | 6.7 km || 
|-id=819 bgcolor=#d6d6d6
| 115819 ||  || — || October 24, 2003 || Socorro || LINEAR || — || align=right | 5.6 km || 
|-id=820 bgcolor=#fefefe
| 115820 ||  || — || October 25, 2003 || Socorro || LINEAR || V || align=right | 1.4 km || 
|-id=821 bgcolor=#E9E9E9
| 115821 ||  || — || October 25, 2003 || Haleakala || NEAT || PAD || align=right | 4.8 km || 
|-id=822 bgcolor=#fefefe
| 115822 ||  || — || October 26, 2003 || Catalina || CSS || — || align=right | 1.2 km || 
|-id=823 bgcolor=#d6d6d6
| 115823 ||  || — || October 26, 2003 || Catalina || CSS || — || align=right | 4.9 km || 
|-id=824 bgcolor=#d6d6d6
| 115824 ||  || — || October 26, 2003 || Socorro || LINEAR || — || align=right | 3.6 km || 
|-id=825 bgcolor=#d6d6d6
| 115825 ||  || — || October 26, 2003 || Kitt Peak || Spacewatch || — || align=right | 5.9 km || 
|-id=826 bgcolor=#d6d6d6
| 115826 ||  || — || October 26, 2003 || Kitt Peak || Spacewatch || THM || align=right | 4.7 km || 
|-id=827 bgcolor=#E9E9E9
| 115827 ||  || — || October 26, 2003 || Kitt Peak || Spacewatch || — || align=right | 4.3 km || 
|-id=828 bgcolor=#E9E9E9
| 115828 ||  || — || October 22, 2003 || Palomar || NEAT || — || align=right | 2.4 km || 
|-id=829 bgcolor=#d6d6d6
| 115829 ||  || — || October 22, 2003 || Anderson Mesa || LONEOS || — || align=right | 6.1 km || 
|-id=830 bgcolor=#fefefe
| 115830 ||  || — || October 25, 2003 || Socorro || LINEAR || NYS || align=right | 1.2 km || 
|-id=831 bgcolor=#d6d6d6
| 115831 ||  || — || October 25, 2003 || Socorro || LINEAR || HYG || align=right | 4.0 km || 
|-id=832 bgcolor=#d6d6d6
| 115832 ||  || — || October 25, 2003 || Socorro || LINEAR || — || align=right | 5.4 km || 
|-id=833 bgcolor=#d6d6d6
| 115833 ||  || — || October 25, 2003 || Socorro || LINEAR || EOS || align=right | 3.5 km || 
|-id=834 bgcolor=#d6d6d6
| 115834 ||  || — || October 25, 2003 || Socorro || LINEAR || HYG || align=right | 6.1 km || 
|-id=835 bgcolor=#E9E9E9
| 115835 ||  || — || October 25, 2003 || Socorro || LINEAR || — || align=right | 5.1 km || 
|-id=836 bgcolor=#E9E9E9
| 115836 ||  || — || October 25, 2003 || Socorro || LINEAR || — || align=right | 4.2 km || 
|-id=837 bgcolor=#fefefe
| 115837 ||  || — || October 25, 2003 || Haleakala || NEAT || — || align=right | 1.7 km || 
|-id=838 bgcolor=#E9E9E9
| 115838 ||  || — || October 26, 2003 || Anderson Mesa || LONEOS || MAR || align=right | 1.7 km || 
|-id=839 bgcolor=#E9E9E9
| 115839 ||  || — || October 26, 2003 || Kitt Peak || Spacewatch || — || align=right | 4.8 km || 
|-id=840 bgcolor=#E9E9E9
| 115840 ||  || — || October 26, 2003 || Haleakala || NEAT || — || align=right | 3.2 km || 
|-id=841 bgcolor=#d6d6d6
| 115841 ||  || — || October 26, 2003 || Haleakala || NEAT || — || align=right | 5.0 km || 
|-id=842 bgcolor=#d6d6d6
| 115842 ||  || — || October 26, 2003 || Haleakala || NEAT || 7:4 || align=right | 7.8 km || 
|-id=843 bgcolor=#d6d6d6
| 115843 ||  || — || October 27, 2003 || Socorro || LINEAR || SYL7:4 || align=right | 9.6 km || 
|-id=844 bgcolor=#E9E9E9
| 115844 ||  || — || October 27, 2003 || Socorro || LINEAR || — || align=right | 1.8 km || 
|-id=845 bgcolor=#fefefe
| 115845 ||  || — || October 27, 2003 || Socorro || LINEAR || ERI || align=right | 3.3 km || 
|-id=846 bgcolor=#d6d6d6
| 115846 ||  || — || October 27, 2003 || Socorro || LINEAR || 7:4 || align=right | 7.2 km || 
|-id=847 bgcolor=#E9E9E9
| 115847 ||  || — || October 27, 2003 || Socorro || LINEAR || — || align=right | 5.4 km || 
|-id=848 bgcolor=#fefefe
| 115848 ||  || — || October 28, 2003 || Socorro || LINEAR || MAS || align=right | 1.8 km || 
|-id=849 bgcolor=#d6d6d6
| 115849 ||  || — || October 28, 2003 || Socorro || LINEAR || HYG || align=right | 4.7 km || 
|-id=850 bgcolor=#E9E9E9
| 115850 ||  || — || October 28, 2003 || Socorro || LINEAR || — || align=right | 4.3 km || 
|-id=851 bgcolor=#E9E9E9
| 115851 ||  || — || October 29, 2003 || Socorro || LINEAR || HEN || align=right | 2.4 km || 
|-id=852 bgcolor=#fefefe
| 115852 ||  || — || October 24, 2003 || Bergisch Gladbach || W. Bickel || — || align=right | 1.5 km || 
|-id=853 bgcolor=#d6d6d6
| 115853 ||  || — || October 17, 2003 || Palomar || NEAT || TIR || align=right | 7.8 km || 
|-id=854 bgcolor=#d6d6d6
| 115854 ||  || — || October 29, 2003 || Socorro || LINEAR || TIR || align=right | 2.6 km || 
|-id=855 bgcolor=#fefefe
| 115855 ||  || — || October 29, 2003 || Socorro || LINEAR || NYS || align=right | 1.4 km || 
|-id=856 bgcolor=#E9E9E9
| 115856 ||  || — || October 29, 2003 || Socorro || LINEAR || GEF || align=right | 2.2 km || 
|-id=857 bgcolor=#E9E9E9
| 115857 ||  || — || October 29, 2003 || Socorro || LINEAR || — || align=right | 3.3 km || 
|-id=858 bgcolor=#d6d6d6
| 115858 ||  || — || October 29, 2003 || Socorro || LINEAR || — || align=right | 5.7 km || 
|-id=859 bgcolor=#E9E9E9
| 115859 ||  || — || October 29, 2003 || Socorro || LINEAR || — || align=right | 3.0 km || 
|-id=860 bgcolor=#E9E9E9
| 115860 ||  || — || October 29, 2003 || Kitt Peak || Spacewatch || — || align=right | 3.1 km || 
|-id=861 bgcolor=#E9E9E9
| 115861 ||  || — || October 29, 2003 || Haleakala || NEAT || DOR || align=right | 4.6 km || 
|-id=862 bgcolor=#E9E9E9
| 115862 ||  || — || October 30, 2003 || Socorro || LINEAR || WIT || align=right | 2.3 km || 
|-id=863 bgcolor=#fefefe
| 115863 ||  || — || October 30, 2003 || Socorro || LINEAR || — || align=right | 1.7 km || 
|-id=864 bgcolor=#fefefe
| 115864 ||  || — || October 30, 2003 || Socorro || LINEAR || — || align=right | 1.4 km || 
|-id=865 bgcolor=#d6d6d6
| 115865 ||  || — || October 29, 2003 || Socorro || LINEAR || TEL || align=right | 2.7 km || 
|-id=866 bgcolor=#d6d6d6
| 115866 ||  || — || October 29, 2003 || Socorro || LINEAR || — || align=right | 4.0 km || 
|-id=867 bgcolor=#E9E9E9
| 115867 ||  || — || October 25, 2003 || Socorro || LINEAR || — || align=right | 1.7 km || 
|-id=868 bgcolor=#fefefe
| 115868 ||  || — || October 25, 2003 || Socorro || LINEAR || — || align=right | 2.0 km || 
|-id=869 bgcolor=#fefefe
| 115869 ||  || — || October 25, 2003 || Socorro || LINEAR || V || align=right | 1.3 km || 
|-id=870 bgcolor=#d6d6d6
| 115870 ||  || — || October 26, 2003 || Socorro || LINEAR || — || align=right | 4.7 km || 
|-id=871 bgcolor=#d6d6d6
| 115871 ||  || — || October 26, 2003 || Kitt Peak || Spacewatch || — || align=right | 3.1 km || 
|-id=872 bgcolor=#fefefe
| 115872 ||  || — || October 27, 2003 || Socorro || LINEAR || — || align=right | 2.1 km || 
|-id=873 bgcolor=#fefefe
| 115873 ||  || — || October 28, 2003 || Socorro || LINEAR || V || align=right | 1.3 km || 
|-id=874 bgcolor=#fefefe
| 115874 ||  || — || October 28, 2003 || Socorro || LINEAR || NYS || align=right | 1.1 km || 
|-id=875 bgcolor=#fefefe
| 115875 ||  || — || October 28, 2003 || Socorro || LINEAR || V || align=right | 1.2 km || 
|-id=876 bgcolor=#d6d6d6
| 115876 ||  || — || October 29, 2003 || Anderson Mesa || LONEOS || — || align=right | 5.4 km || 
|-id=877 bgcolor=#E9E9E9
| 115877 ||  || — || October 29, 2003 || Anderson Mesa || LONEOS || WIT || align=right | 2.0 km || 
|-id=878 bgcolor=#fefefe
| 115878 ||  || — || October 29, 2003 || Anderson Mesa || LONEOS || — || align=right | 1.6 km || 
|-id=879 bgcolor=#E9E9E9
| 115879 ||  || — || October 29, 2003 || Anderson Mesa || LONEOS || — || align=right | 4.3 km || 
|-id=880 bgcolor=#E9E9E9
| 115880 ||  || — || October 30, 2003 || Socorro || LINEAR || EUN || align=right | 3.2 km || 
|-id=881 bgcolor=#E9E9E9
| 115881 ||  || — || October 29, 2003 || Socorro || LINEAR || — || align=right | 3.2 km || 
|-id=882 bgcolor=#E9E9E9
| 115882 ||  || — || October 18, 2003 || Socorro || LINEAR || — || align=right | 3.5 km || 
|-id=883 bgcolor=#fefefe
| 115883 ||  || — || October 16, 2003 || Kitt Peak || Spacewatch || MAS || align=right | 1.8 km || 
|-id=884 bgcolor=#E9E9E9
| 115884 ||  || — || October 19, 2003 || Kitt Peak || Spacewatch || — || align=right | 3.6 km || 
|-id=885 bgcolor=#fefefe
| 115885 Ganz ||  ||  || November 6, 2003 || Piszkéstető || K. Sárneczky, B. Sipőcz || V || align=right | 1.1 km || 
|-id=886 bgcolor=#d6d6d6
| 115886 ||  || — || November 2, 2003 || Socorro || LINEAR || CHA || align=right | 4.2 km || 
|-id=887 bgcolor=#E9E9E9
| 115887 ||  || — || November 1, 2003 || Socorro || LINEAR || — || align=right | 3.7 km || 
|-id=888 bgcolor=#fefefe
| 115888 ||  || — || November 1, 2003 || Socorro || LINEAR || — || align=right | 1.4 km || 
|-id=889 bgcolor=#d6d6d6
| 115889 ||  || — || November 3, 2003 || Socorro || LINEAR || LIX || align=right | 6.4 km || 
|-id=890 bgcolor=#fefefe
| 115890 ||  || — || November 3, 2003 || Socorro || LINEAR || FLO || align=right | 1.0 km || 
|-id=891 bgcolor=#E9E9E9
| 115891 Scottmichael ||  ||  || November 14, 2003 || Wrightwood || J. W. Young || — || align=right | 1.5 km || 
|-id=892 bgcolor=#E9E9E9
| 115892 ||  || — || November 15, 2003 || Kitt Peak || Spacewatch || — || align=right | 2.9 km || 
|-id=893 bgcolor=#E9E9E9
| 115893 ||  || — || November 14, 2003 || Palomar || NEAT || — || align=right | 4.6 km || 
|-id=894 bgcolor=#d6d6d6
| 115894 ||  || — || November 14, 2003 || Palomar || NEAT || EOS || align=right | 3.4 km || 
|-id=895 bgcolor=#fefefe
| 115895 ||  || — || November 14, 2003 || Palomar || NEAT || V || align=right | 1.4 km || 
|-id=896 bgcolor=#d6d6d6
| 115896 ||  || — || November 14, 2003 || Palomar || NEAT || — || align=right | 4.4 km || 
|-id=897 bgcolor=#d6d6d6
| 115897 ||  || — || November 14, 2003 || Palomar || NEAT || — || align=right | 4.7 km || 
|-id=898 bgcolor=#d6d6d6
| 115898 ||  || — || November 15, 2003 || Palomar || NEAT || EOS || align=right | 4.0 km || 
|-id=899 bgcolor=#d6d6d6
| 115899 ||  || — || November 15, 2003 || Kitt Peak || Spacewatch || — || align=right | 8.3 km || 
|-id=900 bgcolor=#fefefe
| 115900 ||  || — || November 4, 2003 || Socorro || LINEAR || H || align=right | 1.3 km || 
|}

115901–116000 

|-bgcolor=#d6d6d6
| 115901 ||  || — || November 15, 2003 || Palomar || NEAT || — || align=right | 3.2 km || 
|-id=902 bgcolor=#d6d6d6
| 115902 ||  || — || November 3, 2003 || Socorro || LINEAR || — || align=right | 6.6 km || 
|-id=903 bgcolor=#E9E9E9
| 115903 ||  || — || November 3, 2003 || Socorro || LINEAR || ADE || align=right | 6.7 km || 
|-id=904 bgcolor=#E9E9E9
| 115904 || 2003 WC || — || November 16, 2003 || Kitt Peak || Spacewatch || — || align=right | 1.6 km || 
|-id=905 bgcolor=#E9E9E9
| 115905 || 2003 WT || — || November 16, 2003 || Catalina || CSS || — || align=right | 1.8 km || 
|-id=906 bgcolor=#fefefe
| 115906 ||  || — || November 16, 2003 || Catalina || CSS || — || align=right | 1.8 km || 
|-id=907 bgcolor=#d6d6d6
| 115907 ||  || — || November 16, 2003 || Catalina || CSS || KOR || align=right | 2.3 km || 
|-id=908 bgcolor=#d6d6d6
| 115908 ||  || — || November 16, 2003 || Catalina || CSS || — || align=right | 3.7 km || 
|-id=909 bgcolor=#d6d6d6
| 115909 ||  || — || November 16, 2003 || Kitt Peak || Spacewatch || EOS || align=right | 3.3 km || 
|-id=910 bgcolor=#d6d6d6
| 115910 ||  || — || November 16, 2003 || Catalina || CSS || — || align=right | 3.7 km || 
|-id=911 bgcolor=#fefefe
| 115911 ||  || — || November 16, 2003 || Catalina || CSS || — || align=right | 1.7 km || 
|-id=912 bgcolor=#E9E9E9
| 115912 ||  || — || November 18, 2003 || Palomar || NEAT || HEN || align=right | 1.5 km || 
|-id=913 bgcolor=#d6d6d6
| 115913 ||  || — || November 18, 2003 || Palomar || NEAT || EOS || align=right | 3.4 km || 
|-id=914 bgcolor=#fefefe
| 115914 ||  || — || November 18, 2003 || Palomar || NEAT || NYS || align=right | 3.4 km || 
|-id=915 bgcolor=#d6d6d6
| 115915 ||  || — || November 18, 2003 || Palomar || NEAT || — || align=right | 3.3 km || 
|-id=916 bgcolor=#B88A00
| 115916 ||  || — || November 18, 2003 || Socorro || LINEAR || unusual || align=right | 8.1 km || 
|-id=917 bgcolor=#E9E9E9
| 115917 ||  || — || November 16, 2003 || Kitt Peak || Spacewatch || ADE || align=right | 3.8 km || 
|-id=918 bgcolor=#E9E9E9
| 115918 ||  || — || November 18, 2003 || Kitt Peak || Spacewatch || — || align=right | 2.7 km || 
|-id=919 bgcolor=#E9E9E9
| 115919 ||  || — || November 18, 2003 || Kitt Peak || Spacewatch || — || align=right | 3.7 km || 
|-id=920 bgcolor=#d6d6d6
| 115920 ||  || — || November 18, 2003 || Palomar || NEAT || — || align=right | 5.1 km || 
|-id=921 bgcolor=#d6d6d6
| 115921 ||  || — || November 18, 2003 || Palomar || NEAT || — || align=right | 3.8 km || 
|-id=922 bgcolor=#E9E9E9
| 115922 ||  || — || November 18, 2003 || Palomar || NEAT || — || align=right | 4.5 km || 
|-id=923 bgcolor=#E9E9E9
| 115923 ||  || — || November 18, 2003 || Palomar || NEAT || — || align=right | 1.8 km || 
|-id=924 bgcolor=#E9E9E9
| 115924 ||  || — || November 18, 2003 || Palomar || NEAT || — || align=right | 3.6 km || 
|-id=925 bgcolor=#fefefe
| 115925 ||  || — || November 16, 2003 || Kitt Peak || Spacewatch || NYS || align=right | 1.2 km || 
|-id=926 bgcolor=#E9E9E9
| 115926 ||  || — || November 18, 2003 || Palomar || NEAT || — || align=right | 4.2 km || 
|-id=927 bgcolor=#d6d6d6
| 115927 ||  || — || November 18, 2003 || Palomar || NEAT || — || align=right | 4.2 km || 
|-id=928 bgcolor=#fefefe
| 115928 ||  || — || November 19, 2003 || Socorro || LINEAR || — || align=right | 1.9 km || 
|-id=929 bgcolor=#E9E9E9
| 115929 ||  || — || November 19, 2003 || Socorro || LINEAR || RAF || align=right | 1.7 km || 
|-id=930 bgcolor=#d6d6d6
| 115930 ||  || — || November 19, 2003 || Palomar || NEAT || 7:4 || align=right | 11 km || 
|-id=931 bgcolor=#fefefe
| 115931 ||  || — || November 19, 2003 || Socorro || LINEAR || H || align=right | 1.2 km || 
|-id=932 bgcolor=#E9E9E9
| 115932 ||  || — || November 18, 2003 || Kitt Peak || Spacewatch || — || align=right | 3.8 km || 
|-id=933 bgcolor=#d6d6d6
| 115933 ||  || — || November 18, 2003 || Kitt Peak || Spacewatch || KOR || align=right | 2.0 km || 
|-id=934 bgcolor=#fefefe
| 115934 ||  || — || November 19, 2003 || Kitt Peak || Spacewatch || FLO || align=right | 1.1 km || 
|-id=935 bgcolor=#E9E9E9
| 115935 ||  || — || November 18, 2003 || Kitt Peak || Spacewatch || — || align=right | 2.0 km || 
|-id=936 bgcolor=#E9E9E9
| 115936 ||  || — || November 18, 2003 || Goodricke-Pigott || Goodricke-Pigott Obs. || — || align=right | 3.3 km || 
|-id=937 bgcolor=#E9E9E9
| 115937 ||  || — || November 18, 2003 || Goodricke-Pigott || R. A. Tucker || ADE || align=right | 4.7 km || 
|-id=938 bgcolor=#fefefe
| 115938 ||  || — || November 18, 2003 || Kitt Peak || Spacewatch || V || align=right | 1.2 km || 
|-id=939 bgcolor=#d6d6d6
| 115939 ||  || — || November 18, 2003 || Palomar || NEAT || HYG || align=right | 6.5 km || 
|-id=940 bgcolor=#fefefe
| 115940 ||  || — || November 18, 2003 || Kitt Peak || Spacewatch || V || align=right | 1.2 km || 
|-id=941 bgcolor=#d6d6d6
| 115941 ||  || — || November 18, 2003 || Kitt Peak || Spacewatch || EOS || align=right | 3.5 km || 
|-id=942 bgcolor=#fefefe
| 115942 ||  || — || November 18, 2003 || Kitt Peak || Spacewatch || — || align=right | 4.4 km || 
|-id=943 bgcolor=#fefefe
| 115943 ||  || — || November 18, 2003 || Kitt Peak || Spacewatch || FLO || align=right | 1.6 km || 
|-id=944 bgcolor=#E9E9E9
| 115944 ||  || — || November 18, 2003 || Kitt Peak || Spacewatch || — || align=right | 2.0 km || 
|-id=945 bgcolor=#E9E9E9
| 115945 ||  || — || November 18, 2003 || Kitt Peak || Spacewatch || — || align=right | 2.6 km || 
|-id=946 bgcolor=#fefefe
| 115946 ||  || — || November 18, 2003 || Kitt Peak || Spacewatch || — || align=right | 4.2 km || 
|-id=947 bgcolor=#fefefe
| 115947 ||  || — || November 18, 2003 || Kitt Peak || Spacewatch || — || align=right | 2.5 km || 
|-id=948 bgcolor=#fefefe
| 115948 ||  || — || November 18, 2003 || Kitt Peak || Spacewatch || — || align=right | 2.2 km || 
|-id=949 bgcolor=#fefefe
| 115949 ||  || — || November 18, 2003 || Kitt Peak || Spacewatch || KLI || align=right | 3.3 km || 
|-id=950 bgcolor=#E9E9E9
| 115950 Kocherpeter ||  ||  || November 18, 2003 || Vicques || M. Ory || — || align=right | 1.8 km || 
|-id=951 bgcolor=#E9E9E9
| 115951 ||  || — || November 19, 2003 || Kitt Peak || Spacewatch || — || align=right | 3.9 km || 
|-id=952 bgcolor=#d6d6d6
| 115952 ||  || — || November 19, 2003 || Kitt Peak || Spacewatch || — || align=right | 6.6 km || 
|-id=953 bgcolor=#fefefe
| 115953 ||  || — || November 19, 2003 || Socorro || LINEAR || — || align=right | 1.9 km || 
|-id=954 bgcolor=#d6d6d6
| 115954 ||  || — || November 19, 2003 || Kitt Peak || Spacewatch || — || align=right | 4.7 km || 
|-id=955 bgcolor=#fefefe
| 115955 ||  || — || November 19, 2003 || Kitt Peak || Spacewatch || — || align=right | 1.5 km || 
|-id=956 bgcolor=#E9E9E9
| 115956 ||  || — || November 19, 2003 || Kitt Peak || Spacewatch || — || align=right | 2.3 km || 
|-id=957 bgcolor=#fefefe
| 115957 ||  || — || November 19, 2003 || Kitt Peak || Spacewatch || — || align=right | 1.6 km || 
|-id=958 bgcolor=#E9E9E9
| 115958 ||  || — || November 19, 2003 || Kitt Peak || Spacewatch || GEF || align=right | 3.0 km || 
|-id=959 bgcolor=#E9E9E9
| 115959 ||  || — || November 19, 2003 || Kitt Peak || Spacewatch || — || align=right | 1.9 km || 
|-id=960 bgcolor=#E9E9E9
| 115960 ||  || — || November 19, 2003 || Kitt Peak || Spacewatch || — || align=right | 4.0 km || 
|-id=961 bgcolor=#E9E9E9
| 115961 ||  || — || November 19, 2003 || Kitt Peak || Spacewatch || — || align=right | 2.0 km || 
|-id=962 bgcolor=#E9E9E9
| 115962 ||  || — || November 19, 2003 || Kitt Peak || Spacewatch || — || align=right | 1.8 km || 
|-id=963 bgcolor=#E9E9E9
| 115963 ||  || — || November 19, 2003 || Kitt Peak || Spacewatch || HEN || align=right | 2.0 km || 
|-id=964 bgcolor=#d6d6d6
| 115964 ||  || — || November 21, 2003 || Socorro || LINEAR || — || align=right | 4.8 km || 
|-id=965 bgcolor=#d6d6d6
| 115965 ||  || — || November 19, 2003 || Palomar || NEAT || EOS || align=right | 4.2 km || 
|-id=966 bgcolor=#d6d6d6
| 115966 ||  || — || November 19, 2003 || Palomar || NEAT || — || align=right | 3.2 km || 
|-id=967 bgcolor=#d6d6d6
| 115967 ||  || — || November 19, 2003 || Palomar || NEAT || EOS || align=right | 3.6 km || 
|-id=968 bgcolor=#d6d6d6
| 115968 ||  || — || November 19, 2003 || Palomar || NEAT || EOS || align=right | 3.6 km || 
|-id=969 bgcolor=#E9E9E9
| 115969 ||  || — || November 19, 2003 || Palomar || NEAT || — || align=right | 4.4 km || 
|-id=970 bgcolor=#d6d6d6
| 115970 ||  || — || November 19, 2003 || Palomar || NEAT || EOS || align=right | 3.0 km || 
|-id=971 bgcolor=#d6d6d6
| 115971 ||  || — || November 19, 2003 || Palomar || NEAT || EOS || align=right | 8.1 km || 
|-id=972 bgcolor=#fefefe
| 115972 ||  || — || November 18, 2003 || Palomar || NEAT || — || align=right | 1.4 km || 
|-id=973 bgcolor=#d6d6d6
| 115973 ||  || — || November 19, 2003 || Socorro || LINEAR || — || align=right | 4.8 km || 
|-id=974 bgcolor=#E9E9E9
| 115974 ||  || — || November 20, 2003 || Socorro || LINEAR || — || align=right | 4.0 km || 
|-id=975 bgcolor=#fefefe
| 115975 ||  || — || November 20, 2003 || Socorro || LINEAR || FLO || align=right | 1.4 km || 
|-id=976 bgcolor=#E9E9E9
| 115976 ||  || — || November 20, 2003 || Socorro || LINEAR || — || align=right | 1.6 km || 
|-id=977 bgcolor=#d6d6d6
| 115977 ||  || — || November 20, 2003 || Socorro || LINEAR || — || align=right | 4.1 km || 
|-id=978 bgcolor=#fefefe
| 115978 ||  || — || November 21, 2003 || Socorro || LINEAR || — || align=right | 1.4 km || 
|-id=979 bgcolor=#E9E9E9
| 115979 ||  || — || November 18, 2003 || Kitt Peak || Spacewatch || HNS || align=right | 1.9 km || 
|-id=980 bgcolor=#d6d6d6
| 115980 ||  || — || November 18, 2003 || Kitt Peak || Spacewatch || KOR || align=right | 2.3 km || 
|-id=981 bgcolor=#fefefe
| 115981 ||  || — || November 18, 2003 || Kitt Peak || Spacewatch || — || align=right | 1.6 km || 
|-id=982 bgcolor=#d6d6d6
| 115982 ||  || — || November 18, 2003 || Kitt Peak || Spacewatch || — || align=right | 4.7 km || 
|-id=983 bgcolor=#E9E9E9
| 115983 ||  || — || November 18, 2003 || Kitt Peak || Spacewatch || AST || align=right | 3.3 km || 
|-id=984 bgcolor=#E9E9E9
| 115984 ||  || — || November 19, 2003 || Kitt Peak || Spacewatch || — || align=right | 3.0 km || 
|-id=985 bgcolor=#fefefe
| 115985 ||  || — || November 19, 2003 || Kitt Peak || Spacewatch || V || align=right | 1.2 km || 
|-id=986 bgcolor=#d6d6d6
| 115986 ||  || — || November 19, 2003 || Kitt Peak || Spacewatch || — || align=right | 5.1 km || 
|-id=987 bgcolor=#d6d6d6
| 115987 ||  || — || November 19, 2003 || Kitt Peak || Spacewatch || THM || align=right | 5.8 km || 
|-id=988 bgcolor=#d6d6d6
| 115988 ||  || — || November 19, 2003 || Kitt Peak || Spacewatch || THM || align=right | 5.1 km || 
|-id=989 bgcolor=#E9E9E9
| 115989 ||  || — || November 19, 2003 || Kitt Peak || Spacewatch || — || align=right | 3.1 km || 
|-id=990 bgcolor=#E9E9E9
| 115990 ||  || — || November 19, 2003 || Kitt Peak || Spacewatch || HEN || align=right | 1.9 km || 
|-id=991 bgcolor=#fefefe
| 115991 ||  || — || November 19, 2003 || Kitt Peak || Spacewatch || — || align=right | 1.8 km || 
|-id=992 bgcolor=#d6d6d6
| 115992 ||  || — || November 19, 2003 || Kitt Peak || Spacewatch || — || align=right | 5.9 km || 
|-id=993 bgcolor=#E9E9E9
| 115993 ||  || — || November 19, 2003 || Kitt Peak || Spacewatch || — || align=right | 1.6 km || 
|-id=994 bgcolor=#fefefe
| 115994 ||  || — || November 19, 2003 || Kitt Peak || Spacewatch || — || align=right | 1.3 km || 
|-id=995 bgcolor=#E9E9E9
| 115995 ||  || — || November 19, 2003 || Kitt Peak || Spacewatch || — || align=right | 4.0 km || 
|-id=996 bgcolor=#E9E9E9
| 115996 ||  || — || November 20, 2003 || Palomar || NEAT || — || align=right | 3.9 km || 
|-id=997 bgcolor=#d6d6d6
| 115997 ||  || — || November 20, 2003 || Socorro || LINEAR || HYG || align=right | 5.1 km || 
|-id=998 bgcolor=#E9E9E9
| 115998 ||  || — || November 20, 2003 || Socorro || LINEAR || HOF || align=right | 5.7 km || 
|-id=999 bgcolor=#d6d6d6
| 115999 ||  || — || November 20, 2003 || Socorro || LINEAR || — || align=right | 4.8 km || 
|-id=000 bgcolor=#E9E9E9
| 116000 ||  || — || November 20, 2003 || Socorro || LINEAR || — || align=right | 4.8 km || 
|}

References

External links 
 Discovery Circumstances: Numbered Minor Planets (115001)–(120000) (IAU Minor Planet Center)

0115